This is an alphabetical list of known Hindi songs performed, sung and/or recorded by Mohammed Rafi between 1942 and 1980. Over 5,000 of his songs are listed here. Mohammed Rafi also sang in several other different languages, which might not be included here.

U 
(42)

 "Uchatano Mon Gharey Roi Na By Kazi Nazrul Islam (Bangali - Unknown) - Aajo Madhuro Banshori Baaje 1981 or 2011"
 "Ud Ja Ud Ja Pyasehyotf Bhanwre (Solo - S. D. Burman/Kaifi Azmi) - Kaagaz Ke Phool 1959"
 "Udein Jab Jab Zulfen Teri (Duet Asha Bhosle - O. P. Nayyar/Sahir Ludhianvi) - Naya Daur 1957"      [O O O O O O ...]
 "Udhar Se Tu Aa Idhar Se Hum Aaise Na Maro Nazaron Ke Bumb Bumb Bumb (Duet Asha Bhosle - Iqbal Qureshi/Aziz Kaisi) - Zamana Badal Gaya 1961"
 "Udhar Se Tum Chalo Idhar Se Hum (Duet Lata Mangeshkar - C. RamChandra/Rajendra Krishan) - Sagai 1951"
 "Udhar Tum Haseen Ho Idhar Dil Jawan Hai (Waltz Geeta Dutt - O. P. Nayyar/Majrooh Sultanpuri) - Mr. and Mrs. 55 [Fifty Five] 1955" [Hun Hun Hun ...]
 "Uf Ye Jawani Yeh Ada U Ss Ha U Ss Ha, Tujh Pe Zamana Hain Fida U Ss Ha U Ss Ha, Uff Yeh Jawani Yeh Ada, Tujh Pe Zamana Hain Fida, Tana Se Leheke Jo Dekhe Baheke, Phir Meri Kya Hain Khata, Chashm -E-Bulbul, Uff Yeh Jawani Yeh Ada, Tujh Pe Zamana Hain Fida, (Solo - Ravi/Sahir Ludhianvi) - Mehmaan 1974"  [Haaye ...]
 "Uff Na Karna Ki Mohabbat Meri Badnaam Na Ho (Duet Asha Bhosle - Anil Biswas/Majrooh Sultanpuri) - Paisa Hi Paisa 1956"
 "Uff Yeh Zindagi, Oof Yeh Doud Dhoop 1 (Solo - S. Naresh-Hansraj Behl/Baburao Rokde-Director) - Doud Dhoop 1983"      [Apni Mizaas Kho Kar Main Ban Gaya Dhaara Yaaron Main Jivan Se Haara ...]
 "Uff Yeh Zindagi, Oof Yeh Doud Dhoop 2 (Solo - S. Naresh-Hansraj Behl/Baburao Rokde - Director) - Doud Dhoop 1980"    [Apni Mithas Kho Kar Main Ban Gaya Khara, Yaaron Main Jeevan Se Haara ...]
 "Uff Yun Umma, Yeh Surat, Uff Yun Umma, Pyar Kyun Na Hoga, Yeh Aadayein, Uff Yun Umma, ..Yeh Mausam, Uff Yun Umma, Yeh Dhadkan, Uff Yun Umma, Kaise Dil Ko Ro Ke, Koi Thaame, Uff Yun Umma, Yeh Ankhein, Uff Yun Umma (Duet Lata Mangeshkar - Shankar-Jaikishan/Hasrat Jaipuri) - Jab Pyar Kisi Se Hota Hai 1961" [Yeh Ankhein ...]
 "Ujad Gaya Panchi Ab Tera Basera (Solo - Ravi/Rajendra Krishan) - Ghar Ki Laaj 1960"
 "Ulfat Ki Zindagi Ke Jo Saal Ho Hazaar (Multi Chitalkar and Lata Mangeshkar - C. Ramchandra/Rajendra Krishan) - Hungama 1952" 
 "Ulfat Mein Har Ek (Multi Kishore Kumar and Asha Bhosle - Anil Biswas/Majrooh Sultanpuri) - Paisa Hi Paisa 1956"
 "Ulte Seedhe Dao Lagayein (Duet Asha Bhosle - S. D. Burman/Kaifi Azmi) - Kaagaz Ke Phool 1959"
 "Ulzhan Ho Chahein Koi Aa Jaye Mushkil (Qawali Duet - Unknown/Unknown) Chambal Ke Daku 1982 and Evergreen Mohd Rafi ****" 
 "Un Ka Badha Jo Haath Yanhaan, Dil Luta Diya, Un Ka Badha Jo Haath Yanhaan, Dil Luta Diya (Solo - Ghulam Mohammed/Kaifi Azmi) - Shama 1961"      [Woh Sadagi Kahen Ise, Diwaanagi Kahe, ...]
 "Un Ke Khayal Aaye to Aate Chale Gaye, Unke Khayal Aaye to Aate Chale Gaye, Diwana Zindagi Ko Banate Chale Gaye, Unke Khayal.. (Classical Solo - Shankar-Jaikishan/Hasrat Jaipuri) - Lal Patthar 1971"
 "Un Par Kaun Kare Ji Vishwas, Un Par Kaun Kare Ji Vishwas, Kiye Bhawaron Ka Vesh, Phirein Kaliyon Ke Desh, Karein Rasiya Jo Ghar Ghar Piya, Un Par Kaun Kare Ji Vishwas, ..O O O Yeh To Jug Jug Ki Hain Pyaas, Yeh To Jug Jug Ki Hain Pyaas, Jise Bhanwara Bujhaye, Kali Kali Paas Jaaye, Karein Puri Adhuri Woh Aas, Yeh To Jug Jug Ki Hain Pyaas, Yeh To Jug Jug Ki Hain Pyaas (Duet Lata Mangeshkar - Shri Nath Tripathi/Bharat Vyas) - Kavi Kalidas 1958"      [Preet Ke Badhan Mein ...]
 "Un Se Rippi Tippi Ho Gayi (Duet Geeta Dutt - Roshan Lal/Prem Dhawan) - Agra Road 1957"
 "Unche Unche Mahlon Wale (Solo - Maan Mohan Kohli/Raja Mehdi Ali Khan) - Jaagir 1959"
 "Unchi Aedi Hain Maang Tedhi Tedhi, Dupatta RangDAar Karke (Duet Shamshad Begum - Hansraj Behl/Prem Dhawan) - Miss Bombay 1957"      [Fisli ...]
 "Ungaliyan Hain Gee Mein (Duet Shamshad Begum - Sanmukh Babu/Bharat Vyas) - Lalkaar 1956"
 "Unhe Kissa E Gham (Solo - Madan Mohan Kohli/Hasrat Jaipuri) - Naya Kanoon 1965"
 "Unhe Manzil Nahin Milti (Solo - Babu Singh/Madhukar Bihari) - Vidhyarthi 1966"
 "Upar Dekho Ya Neeche (Solo - Shankar-Jaikishan/Gulshan Bawra) - Aan Baan II 1972"
 "Upar Se Ujle Bhitar Se Kaale (Solo - Suresh Talwar/Bharat Vyas) - Fashionable Wife 1959"
 "Upar Wale Ne Jaldi Mein (Solo - Kalyanji Verji Shah/Gulshan Bawra) - Gha Ghar Ki Baat 1959"
 "Us Chaand Se Pyare Chaand Ho Tum (Duet Lata Mangeshkar - Hansraj Behl/Darbar Lal) - Raat Ki Rani 1949"
 "Us Jaan-E-Do-Alam Ka Jalwa Parade Mein Hain Aur Parada Bhi Hain (Qawali Duet Manna Dey - C. Arjun/Sahir Ludhianvi) - Nawab Sahib 1978"       [Aa Aa Aa ..]
 "Us Ladki Ka Hain Naam Kala (Solo - Chitragupt/Rajendra Krishan) - Suhaag Sindoor 1961"
 "Us Maalik Ki Daya Se Ab To Khushiyon Ki Barsaat Huyi ….Kaam Karo (Duet Asha Bhosle - Sonik-Omi/Verma Malik) - Bhookh 1978"
 "Us Mulk Ki Sarhad Ko Koi Choo Nahin Sakta, Us Mulk Ki Sarhad Ki Nighe-Baan Hain Ankhen (Patriotic Solo - Ravi/Sahir Ludhianvi) - Ankhen I 1968"
 "Us Paar Iss Deewar Ke Jo Rahte Hain, Koi Kahe De Un Se Ja Ke Jo Hum Kahete Hain (Solo - Sajjad Hussain/Deena Nath Madhok) - Saiyan 1951"
 "Ustadi Ustad Se (Qawali Multi Manna Dey and Asha Bhosle - Ram Laxman/Ravinder Rawal) - Ustadi Ustad Se 1982"      [Aa Aa Aa .. Ishq Ka Joda Wapas De De ...]
 "Uth Ae Watan Ke Naujawan (Patriotic Multi Geeta Roy and Pramodini Desai - Hansraj Behl/Sarshar Sailani) - Kashmir 1951" 
 "Uth Jaag Musafir Bhor Bhayi Ab Rain Kahaan Jo Sowat Hai (Prayer Solo - J. P. Kaushik/Traditional) - Aankhin Dekhi 1978"      [Un Un Un Aa Aa Aa]  
 "Uth Neend Se Mirzia Jaag Ja (Duet Lata Mangeshkar - Laxmikant-Pyarelal/Anand Bakshi) - Pratiggya 1975"
 "Uth Neend Se Mirzia JAag Ja, Teri Sahiba Kare Pukar Tu Ek Akela Bhag Ja (Duet Lata Mangeshkar - Laxmikant-Pyarelal) - Pratigya 1975"      [Aa Aa Aa ...]
 "Utha Kar Sar Chalo Jawan (Patriotic Solo - Datta Devjekar and Jagannath/Anjaan) - Golconda Ka Qaidi 1954"
 "Utha Surahi Yah Sheesha (Urdu Ghazal Solo - Mohammed Rafi/K. Mohinder Singh Bedi) - Rafi Aye Jaan E Ghazal ****"
 "Utho Bulbula Tod Do Taaliyan (Duet Geeta Roy - Hansraj Behl/Deena Nath Madhok) - Khamosh Sipahi 1950"

V 
(11)

 "Vaada Bhool Na Jaana (Duet Lata Mangeshkar - Laxmikant-Pyarelal/Maya Govind) - Jalte Badan 1973"
 "Vai Vai Loshe Loshe O Dilbar Ishq Kurbana (Duet Asha Bhosle - Manohar/Aziz Kaisi) - Do Dushman 1967"
 "Vallah Kya Baat Hain Ho O O Vallah Kya Bat Hain Kya Baat Hain (Swing - Roshan Lal/Prem Dhawan) - Vallah Kya Baat Hai 1962"      [Woh Bijli Hain Hum Shola Aaj Na Jaane Kya Hoga Chand Se Takkar Sooraj Ki Lo Aaya Din Qayamat Ho Ho Yaaro Husn Ki Ishq Se Yeh Pehli Mulaqat Hain Aha Ha Ha ...]
 "Vaqif Hoon Khoob Ishq Ke Tarze Bayan Se Main (Qawali Duet Manna Dey - Roshan Lal/Sahir Ludhianvi) - Bahu Begum 1967"      [Aa Aa Aa ..Arje Shauk Aankhon Mein Hain, Arje Wafa Aankhon Mein Hain, Tere Aage BAat Kehne Ka Maza Aankhon Mein Hain, Aur ...]
 "Vardi Hain Bhagwan, Fauji Mera Naam, Vardi Hain Bhagwan, Fauji Mera Naam (Patriotic Multi Manna Dey, Kumar Sonik, Asha Bhosle and Meenu Purushottam - Sonik-Omi/M. G. Hashmat) - Fauji 1976"
 "Ve Raab Na Kare Tu Chala Jaye ..Tas Roya Karenga Tanu Yaad Kar Ke (Punjabi Duet Shamshad Begum - Hansraj Behl) - Bhangara 1958"
 "Vidhi Ne Dekho 1 (Solo - Vasant Desai/Bharat Vyas) - Ram Rajya 1967"
 "Vidhi Ne Dekho 2 (Duet Suman Kalyanpur - Vasant Desai/Bharat Vyas) - Ram Rajya 1967"
 "Vijay Mein Aas Hain (Solo - Satyam/B. R. Tripathi) - Alakh Niranjan II 1975"
 "Viraan Mera Dil Hain, Dil Ki Bahar Aaja, Sun Le Pukar Meri, Dil Ke Qaraar Aaja (Duet Lata Mangeshkar - C. RamChandra/Rajendra Krishan) - Lutera 1955"      [Kahan Hain Mere, Dil Ki Duniya, Kahan Hain, Kahan, Mohobbat Ke Hote Hain, Tukade Jahan, Wahaan Hain Wahaan ...]
 "Virale Geet Kase, Jhali Manachi Shakle, Mee Disha Heen, Aata Sare Sahare Mitle, Virale Geet (Marathi Solo - Shrikant Thakre/Vandana Vitankar) - Rafi Smrutit Rahile Geet and Navaras Sad ****"

W 

(42)

 "Waada Kar Le Sajna, Waada Kar Le Sajna, Tere Bin Main Na Rahoon, Mere Bin Tu Na Rahein, Ho Ke Juda, Yeh Wada Raha, Na Honge Juda, Yeh Wada Raha (Duet Lata Mangeshkar - Kalyanji Anadji/Gulshan Bawra) - Haath Ki Safai 1974"
 "Waah Allah Kurbaan ..O Meri Jaan Mera Imaan (Duet Manna Dey - Sonik-Omi) - Pandit Aur Pathan 1977"
 "Waah Chand Sa Chehra Liye (Solo - Iqbal Qureshi - Shewan Rizvi) - Qawali Ki Raat 1964"
 "Waah Re Wah Bhagwan, Kaisi Banayi Duniya (Duet Lata Mangeshkar - Husnlal-Bhagatram/Ramesh Gupta, Gulshan Jalalabadi and Qamar Jalalabadi) - Raja Harishchandra 1952"
 "Waah Re Zamane Kya Rang (Solo - Govind Ram/Ishwar Chandra Kapoor) - Ghar Ki Izzat 1948"
 "Waah Waah Badla Zamana Chhe Naye Paison Ka Puarana Ek Aana (Solo - S. D. Burman/Rajendra Krishan) - Miss India 1957"      [Aa Ha Badla Zamana ...]
 "Waah Waah Re Teri Chaal Kabhi Left Kabhi Right (Solo Horse-Cart - O. P. Nayyar) - Do Dilon Ki Dastan 1967"      [Chal Beta Left Chal Beta Right ...]
 "Wadiyan Mera Daaman - I (Solo - R. D. Burman/Majrooh Sultanpuri) - Abhilasha 1968 and Mohammed Rafi Collection Vol. 9 ****" 
 "Wafa Tumharein Liye Beqaraar Rehti Hain (Solo -  Baldev Nath Bali/Raja mehdi Ali Khan) - Mastani 1955"
 "Wai Wai Qurban O Meri Jaan (Duet TunTun aka Uma Devi Khatri - Pardesi/Shyam Hindi) - Khufia Mahal 1964"
 "Wallah Hum Se Puchho (Duet Krishna Kalle - Rajkamal/Asad Bhopali) - Achha Bura 1972" 
 "Waqif Hoon Khoob Ishq Ke (Duet Manna Dey - Roshan Lal/Sahir Ludhianvi) - Bahu Begum 1967"
 "Waqt Se Din Aur Raat, Waqt Se Kal Aur Aaj, Waqt Ki Har Shaiy Ghulam, Waqt Ka Har Shaiy Pe Raaj (Solo - Ravi/Sahir Ludhianvi) - Waqt 1965"      [Kal Jahaan Basati Thi Khushiyaan, Aaj Hain Mautam Wahan, Waqt Laya Tha Baharein, Waqt Laya Hain Fida ...]
 "Watan Ka Kya Hoga AnjAam Bacha Le Ae Maula Ae RAam (Patriotic Solo - Ravi) - Aadmi Aur Insaan 1969"      [Bina SifAarish Mile Naukari Bin Rishavat Ko KAam ..Kaliyug NAam ...]
 "Watan Ki Amaanat Meri Zindagi Hain (Patriotic Duet Shamshad Begum - Govind Ram/Rammurti Chaturvedi-Ishwar Chandra Kapoor) - Rupa 1946"
 "Watan Ki Raah Mein Watan Ke Naujawan Shaheed Hon (Patriotic Duet Khan Mastana - Ghulam Haider/Raja Mehdi Ali Khan) - Shaheed 1948"   (Cine actor Dilip Kumar's Sister had tears in her eyes and she had cried bitterly unconsolably)
 "Watan Pe Jo Fida Hoga, Amar Woh Naujawan Hoga (Patriotic Solo - Kalyanji-Anandji/Anand Bakshi) - Phool Bane Angarey 1963"      [Himala Ki Bulandi Se, Suno Awaaz Hain Aayi, Kahon Maon Se, De Bete, Kahon Bahanon Se, De Bhai, ...]
 "Woh Aaj Apni Mehfil Mein Aayein Huye Hain (Solo - Ravi/Kamil Rashid) - Mehndi 1958"
 "Woh Apni Yaad Dilane Ko Ek Ishq Ki Duniya Chhod Gaye, Woh Apni Yaad Dilane Ko Ek Ishq Ki Duniya Chhod Gaye, Jaldi Mein Jaldi Mein Lipi-stick Bhul Gaye Woh Maal Purana Chhod Gaye (Multi Unknown - Firoze Nizame/Asgar Sarhady) - Jugnu 1947 (Rafi Appearance As An Actor)" 
 "Woh Aur Zamana Tha, Yeh Aur Zamana Hain, Badla Hua Duniya Mein, Ulfat Ka Fasana Hain, Woh Aur Zamana Tha, Yeh Aur Zamana Hain (Modernization Qawali Duet Geeta Roy - Husnlal-Bhagatram/Qamar Jalalabadi) - Hamari Manzil 1949"      [Aa Aa Aa ..Badla Hua Duniya Mein, Ulfat Ka Fasana Hain, Ulfat Ka Fasana Hain ...]
 "Woh Aurat Hain Jo Insanon Ki (Solo - Ravi/Shakeel Badayuni) - Grihasthi 1963"
 "Woh Bharat Desh Hain Mera (Patriotic - HansRaj Behl) - Sikandar-E-Azam 1965"      [Jahan Daal Daal Par Sone Ki Chidiya ...]   
 "Woh Bharat Desh Hain Mera, Woh Bharat Desh Hain Mera, ..JahAan Satya Ahinsa Aur Daram Ka Pag Pag Laga Dhera Woh Bharat Desh Hain Mera, Woh Bharat Desh Hain Mera, Jai Bharati, Jai Bharati (Diwali, Janmashthami Patriotic - Hansraj Behl) - Sikander-E-Azam 1965"      [Aa Aa Aa ..Gurur Brahma, Gurur Vishnu, Gurur Devo Maheshwara, Gurur Sakshat Par-Brahmam, Tasmesri Guru  Devamaha, ..JahAan DAal DAal Par, Sone Ki Chidiyan Karati Hain Basera, ...]
 "Woh Bijli Hain Hum Shola ..Vallah Kya Baat Hain (Twist Solo - Roshan Lal/Prem Dhawan) - Vallah Kya Baat Hai 1962"
 "Woh Chale Woh Chale Jhatak Ke Daman Mero Arzoo Mita Ke Mita Ke (Solo - Shankar-Jaikishan/Hasrat Jaipuri) - Humrahi 1963"      [Woh Chale, Haan, …]  
 "Woh Dekho Aayi Baharein Layi (Duet Suman Kalyanpur - N. Dutta aka Datta Naik/Gulshan Bawra) - First Love 1961"
 "Woh Din Yaad Karo, ..Woh Chhup Chhup Ke Milna, Woh Hasna Hasaana, ..Woh Phoolon Ki Chhaiyaan, Woh Mausam Suhana (Duet Lata Mangeshkar - Shankar-Jaikishan/Hasrat Jaipuri) - Humrahi 1963"
 "Woh Door Jo Nadiya Behti Hain, Wahan Ik Albeli Rehti Hain, Sun Bhaiya Wahin Meri Bhabhi Hain, Gora Mukhada Gaal Gulabi Hain (Brother-Sister Duet Lata Mangeshkar - Chitragupt/Rajendra Krishan) - Barkha 1959"
 "Woh Ek Taraf Tanha Hain (Solo - Sonik-Omi/Verma Malik) - Lahu Pukarega 1980"
 "Woh Hain Zara Khafa Khafa To Nain Yun Churaye Hain Ke Ho O Ho O Ho~o~o Na Bol Doon To Kya Karoon Woh Hus Ke Yun Bulaye Hain O Ho O Ho O~ho~ho (Swing Duet Lata Mangeshkar - Laxmikant-Pyarelal/Majrooh Sultanpuri) - Shagird 1967"
 "Woh Hum Na The Woh Tum Na The Woh Reh Gujar Bahar Ki Palki Bahaar Ki (Solo - Iqabal Qureshi/Neeraj) - Cha Cha Cha 1964" 
 "Woh Jab Yaad Aaye, Bahot Yaad Aaye, Woh Jab Yaad Aaye, Bahot Yaad Aaye, Gham-E-Zindagi Ke Andhere Mein Hum Ne, Chirag-E-Mohobbat Jalaye Bujhaye, Woh Jab Yaad Aaye, Bahot Yaad Aaye (Duet Lata Mangeshkar - Laxmikant-Pyarelal/Asad Bhopali) - Parasmani 1963"      [Aa Aa Aa ..O O O ...]
 "Woh Jo Aa Rahin Hain Ghar Mein (Duet G. M. Durrani - Vasant Desai/Raja Mehdi Ali Khan) - Anand Bhavan 1953" 
 "Woh Jo Chahne Wale Hain Tere Sanam (Duet Asha Bhosle - O. P. Nayyar/Jan Nisar Akhtar) - Duniya Rang Rangeeli 1957"
 "Woh Kaun Hain Jo Nigahon Mein (Solo - R. C. Boral/Hasrat Jaipuri) - Dard-E-Dil 1953" 
 "Woh Kaun Si Mushkil Hain (Solo - Hemant Kumar/Prem Dhawan) - Maa Beta 1962" 
 "Woh Khushi Mili Hain Mujh Ko Main Khushi Se Mar Na Jaoon (Piano - Shankar-Jaikishan/hasrat Jaipuri) - Mere Huzoor 1968"      [Aa Aa Aa ..Jo Gujar Rahin Hain Mujh Par Usse Kaise Main Bataoon ...]
 "Woh Marne Se Nahin Darte (Solo - Husnlal-Bhagatram/Majrooh Sultanpuri) - Shama Parwana 1954"
 "Woh Mohabbat Wo Wafayein Kis Tarah Hum Bhool Jaayein Aye Gam-e-Dil Jee Rahe Hain Tujh Ko De Kar Hum Duaayein (Solo - Roshan Lal/Shakeel Badayuni) - Noor Jehan 1967"
 "Woh Nazar Le Ke Rahi Dil Ka (Qawali Duet Asha Bhosle - Bappi Lahiri/Kaifi Azmi) - Suraag 1982"
 "Woh Saadgi Kahein Isse (Solo - Ghulam Mohammed/Kaifi Azmi) - Shama 1961"
 "Woh Teer Dil Pe Chala, Jo Teri Kamaan Mein Hain, Haye Kisi Ki Aankh Mein Hai Jadu, Teri Jubaan Mein Hai (Duet Asha Bhosle - Roshan Lal/Majrooh Sultanpuri) - Aarti II 1962"
 "Woh To Chutki Mein Dil (Duet Raja Gul - Govind Ram/Sarshar Sailani) - Shadi Ki Raat 1950"
 "Woh Woh Na Rahe, Jeen Ke Liye Hum Thhey Bekarar (Solo - Laxmikant-Pyarelal/Anjaan) - Badalte Rishte 1978"
 "Wo Phoole Phoole Phirte Hain (Solo - Vasant Desai/Bharat Vyas) - Amar Jyoti I 1965"

Y 

(225)

 "Ya Hala Yaa Habibi (Duet Lata Mangeshkar - Chitragupt/Majrooh Sultanpuri) - Kabli Khan 1963"
 "Yaa Illahi, Ek Haseena Ne Machai Hain Tabai (Solo - Madan Mohan Kohli/Rajendra Krishan) - Kaise Kategi Zindagi Tere Bagair 2011" (Previously Unreleased)
 "Yaa Kah De Hum Insaan Nahin, Ya Maan Jaa Tu Bhagwan Nahin, Ya Kah De Hum Insaan Nahin, Ya Maan Jaa Tu Bhagwan Nahin (Prayer Solo - Salil Chowdhary/Rajendra Krishan) - Chhaya 1961"
 "Yaa Kurban, Woh Aankhen Thi Dilwar Ki, Ya Nargise-E-Mastana, Dekhe Huye Us Ko, Ab Ho Gaya Zamana, Mustafa Kehana Mere DilDar Ko, Dil Tadapata Hain Deedar Ko, Mustafa Kehana Mere DilDar Ko, Dil Tadapata Hain Deedar Ko (Qawali Afgan Style - Salil Chowdhary/Prem Dhawan) - Kabuliwala 1961"      [Ho ...]      (A Person Living in India Missing Homeland, The Afgan, a Patriotic Song)"
 "Yaa Maalik Dilwa De Ek Ladki (Duet Asha Bhosle - Laxmikant-Pyarelal/Rajendra Krishan) - Laadla 1966"
 "Yaa Meri Manzil Bata Ya Zindagi Ko Chhin Le (Solo - Ravi/Rajendra Krishan) - Rakhi 1962"
 "Yaad Aane Lagi ..O O O ..YAad Aane Lagi, Dil Dukhane Lagi, O O ..Chandani RAat Ab Satane Lagi, Satane Lagi O O O YAad Aane Lagi (Duet Lata Mangeshkar - K. Datta aka Dwarkesh aka Dwarkesh/Ehsan Rizvi) - Daman 1951"      [Aa Aa Aa ..O O O ...]
 "Yaad Aane Lagi Dil (Duet Lata Mangeshkar - K. Datta aka Dwarkesh/Ehsan Rizvi) - Daaman 1951"
 "Yaad Mein Teri Jaag Jaag Ke Hum Raat Bhar Karvatein Badalte Hain (Duet Lata Mangeshkar - Naushad Ali/Shakeel Badayuni) - Mere Mehboob 1963"
 "Yaad Na Jaaye Beete Dinon Ki Jaa Ke Na Aaye Jo Din Dil Kyun Bulaye Unhe Dil Kyun Bulaye (Solo - Shankar-Jaikishan/Shailendra) - Dil Ek Mandir 1963 and Mohammed Rafi Collection Vol. 3 and 5 ****"
 "Yaadon Ki Baaraat Nikali Hain Aaj Dil Ke Dware (Friendship Duet Kishore Kumar - R. D. Burman/Majrooh Sultanpuri) - Yaadon Ki Baaraat 1973 and Mohammed Rafi Collection Vol. 9 ****"
 "Yaar Chulbula Hain Haseen Dilruba Hain, Jhoot Bolta Hain, Magar Jara Jara, To Bolo Ji, Phir Kya Kare Deewana (Duet Asha Bhosle - Usha Khanna/Majrooh Sultanpuri) - Dil Deke Dekho 1959"
 "Yaar Jinhein Tum Bhool Gaye Ho, Yaar Jinhein Tum Bhool Gaye Ho, Woh Din Yaad Karo I (Solo - Laxmikant-Pyarelal/Anand Bakshi) - Woh Din Yaad Karo 1971" 
 "Yaar Mera Laut Aaya Re (Multi Asha Bhosle, Anwar and Suresh Wadekar - Bappi Lahiri) - Taxi Chor 1980"
 "Yaar Mere Meri Bahoon Mein Aa Ja, Yaar Mere Meri Bahon Mein Aa Ja, Na Ja Re Na Ja Dil Ko Tarsa Ke Na Ja, Yaar Mere Meri Bahon Mein Aa Ja (Solo - Jagdish J./Anjaan) - Jeewan Rekha 1974"  
 "Yaar Mil Gaya To Khuda (Multi Manna Dey and Asha Bhosle - R. D. Burman/Gulshan Bawra) - Ganga Meri Maa 1983"
 "Yaar Tere Sab Naach Rahe Hain Saj Ke Chali Baarat Tere Main Sad Ke Jawa (Shadi Solo - Rajesh Roshan/Verma Malik) - Shakka 1981"
 "Yaara Dholak Ko Khub Bajao (Duet Shamshad Begum - Husnlal-Bhagatram/B. A. Moti B. A.) - Rajput 1951"    
 "Yaaran Naal Bahaaran 1 (Punjabi Duet Surinder Kohli - Surinder Kohli) - Jindari Yaar Di 1978"
 "Yaaran Naal Bahaaran 2 (Solo - Surinder Kohli) - Jindari Yaar Di 1978"      [Duniya Dekhi GurDwar Hi Yaar Bina Na Koi ...]
 "Yaari Meri Yaar Se Na Chhute (Duet Sulakshana Pandit - Padmashree/Sajan Dehlvi-Padmashree) - Kaise Kaise Log 1983 and Evergreen Mohd Rafi ****"
 "Yaaro Main Bada Pareshan Na Jaan Na Pahchaan Ek Ladki Jawan Padi Hai Mere Peeche Kare Hairaan (Solo - Usha Khanna) - Roop Rupaiyya 1968"
 "Yaaro Mera Saath Nibhao Roz Aisi Mehfil Kahan Bheeg Jaye Aaj Palkein Aao Hunse Itna (Piano Solo - Laxmikant-Pyarelal/Majrooh Sultanpuri) - Pyasi Shaam 1969"
 "Yaaro Ne Mujh Ko Bulaya (Solo - Rajesh Roshan/Amit Khanna) - Unees Bees 1980"
 "Yaaro Surat Humari Pe Mat Jao, Yaaro Surat Humari Pe Mat Jao, Yahaan Bhi Dil Hain, Yun Hum Se Na Takarao, Yahaan Bhi Dil Hain, Yun Hum Se Na Takarao, ..Yaaro Surat Humari Pe Mat Jao, Yahaan Bhi Dil Hain, Yun Hum Se Na Takarao, Yaaro Surat Humari Pe Mat Jao (Friendship Duet Mukesh - Shankar-Jaikishan/Shailendra) - Ujala 1959"
 "Yaaro Yeh Jo Duniya Hain, Maine Isse Dekha Hain, Maine Isse Samajha Hain, Sab Dhokha Hi Dhokha Hain, Jiyo Ram (Solo - Ravi/Rajendra Krishan) - Bharosa 1963"      [Yaaro Yaaro ...]
 "Yaaron Ab Kya Hoga (Qawali Type Duet Asha Bhosle - Usha Khanna/Saawan Kumar Tak) - Ab Kya Hoga 1977"      [Sar-E-Mehfil Mera Imman Be-Imman ..]
 "Yaaron Ka Pyar Liye Nakhare Hazaar Liye, Jaati Hain Gori Bulao Re Koi, Yaaron Ka Pyar Liye Nakhare Hazaar Liye, Jaati Hain Gori Bulao Re Koi, Uljhe Se Baal Wala Lal Lal Rumal Wala, Chhede Hain Mohe Bachao Re Koi, Acchha Ji, Uljhe Se Baal Wala Lal Lal Rumal Wala, Chhede Hain Mohe Bachao Re Koi (Duet Asha Bhosle - Chitragupt/Majrooh Sultanpuri) - Kali Topi Lal Rumal 1959" 
 "Yaaron Main Bada Pareshan (Solo - Usha Khanna/Pyare Lal Santoshi) - Roop Rupaiya 1968"
 "Yaas Ki Dar Pe Jhuka Jata Hain Sar Aaj Ki Raat, Yaas Ke Dar Pe Jhuka Jata Hain Sar Aaj Ki Raat, Neend Kya Maut Na Aayegi Idhar Aaj Ki Raat (Duet Suman Kalyanpur - Ghulam Mohammed/Kaifi Azmi) - Shama 1961"
 "Yah Khuda Khoi Kismat Jaga De, Har Moosulmaan Ko Haanzi Bana De (Prayer Solo - Kamal Rajsthani/Mehboob Sarwar) - Mere Gharib Nawaaz 1973"
 "Yahan Badla Wafa Ka Bewafai Ke Siwa Kya Hain Mohabbat Kar Ke Bhi Dekha Mohabbat Mein Bhi Dokha Hain Kabhi Dukh Hain Kabhi Sukh Hain Abhi Kya Tha Abhi Kya Hain Yunhi Duniya Badlti Hain Issi Ka Naam Duniya Hain (Duet Noor Jehan - Feroze Nizami-Mohammed Rafi/M. G. Adeeb-Asghar Sarhadi) - Jugnu 1947"       (This duet become a hit, which led Naushad Ali to use Rafi as Solo Playback singer in Chandni Raat, Dillagi and Dulari in 1949.)
 "Yahan Bhi To Nahin Hain, [Chal] Wahan To Nahin Hain, [Kumaal Ho Gaya Re Haan] Yahan Bhi To Nahin Hain, Wahan To Nahin Hain, Na Jane Mera Dil, Chhota Sa Mera Dil, Nanha Sa Mera Dil, Kahan Kho Gaya, Haaye Kumaal Ho Gaya (Solo - Kalyanji-Anandji/Gulshan Bawra) - Preet Na Jane Reet 1964"
 "Yahan Hum Wahan Tum, Mera Dil Hua Hain Goom, Bolo Kahaan, Aji Yahan, Bolo Kahaan, Aji Yahan, Yahin Hum Yahin Tum, Kahin Ho Jaye Na Goom, Bolo Kahaan, Are Yahan, Bolo Kahaan, Are Yahan .. (Duet Geeta Dutt - O. P. Nayyar/Jan Nisar Akhtar) - Shrimati 420 [Four Twenty] 1956"
 "Yahan Jo Jhoot Bolega Woh Hi Noton Se Khelega (Duet Asha Bhosle - Babul/Anjum Jaipuri) - Sara Jahan Hamara 1961"
 "Yahan Kitne Hi Dil Toote O Duniya Teri (Solo - Ravindra Jain/Ravindra Jain) - Khoon Kharaba 1980"
 "Yahan Main Ajnabi Hoon Main Jo Hoon Bas Wohin Hoon (Piano Solo - Kalyanji-Anandji/Anand Bakshi) - Jab Jab Phool Khile 1965 and Mohammed Rafi Collection Vol. 10 ****"      [Kabhi Pehle Dekha Nahin Yeh Samaan Yeh Main Bhul Se Aa Gaya Hoon Kahan ...]
 "Yahan Se Hum Uthe To (Multi Manna Dey and Asha Bhosle - R. D. Burman/Majrooh Sultanpuri) - Chor Ho To Aisa 1978"
 "Yahi To Din Hain Baharon Ke (Duet Asha Bhosle - Chitragupt/Rajendra Krishan) - Main Bhi Ladki Hoon 1964"
 "Yakeen Kar Lo Mujhe Mohabbat Hain Tum Se Tum Se Meri Yeh Duniya Haseen Jannat Tum Se Tum Se (Solo - Shankar-Jaikishan/Hasrat Jaipuri) - Yakeen 1969" 
 "Yamma Yamma (Qawali Multi Asha Bhosle - Ravi/Majrooh Sultanpuri) - China Town 1962"      [Kya Teri Mehfil Hai Sanam Kho Gaye Hum Allah Ki Kasam ...]
 "Yamma Yamma Kya Khoobsurat Sama Bas Aaj Ki Raat Hain Zindagi Kal Hum Kahan Tum Kahan (Duet R. D. Burman - R. D. Burman/Anand Bakshi) - Shaan 1980"     
 "Yamuna (Jamuna) Ke Tat (Duet Rekha Rani - Dutt Thakur/Mohan Mishra) - Amar Prem I 1948" (Rafi Sings for Raj Kapoor)
 "Ye Aapne Kya Kah Diya Ke Hone Laga Dil Mein (Duet Asha Bhosle - Laxmikant-Pyarelal/Majrooh Sultanpuri) - Khuda Kasam 1981 and Evergreen Mohd Rafi ****"
 "Ye Bahakti Ghatayein (Duet Asha Bhosle - Suresh Kumar/Zafar Rahi-Naza Sholapuri) - Rustom E Rome 1964"
 "Ye Bheegi Fizaayein (Duet Hemlata - Ravindra Jain/Ravindra Jain) - Kaanch Aur Heera 1972"
 "Ye Dil Nahin Hain Ke Jis Ke Sahare Ji Te Hain Lahu Ka Jaam Hain Jo Subah Shaam Pee Te Hain Yeh Dil Nahin Hain (Solo - Sonik-Omi/G. L. Rawal) - Aabroo III 1968"
 "Ye Dil Tum Bin Kahin Lagta Nahin, Hum Kya Karein, Ye Dil Tum Bin Kahin Lagta Nahin, Hum Kya Karein, Tassavar Mein Koi Basta Nahin, Hum Kya Karein, Tumhin Keh Do Ab Aye Jane Wafa, Hum Kya Karein, ..Loote Dil Mein Diya Jalta Nahin, Hum Kya Karein, Tumhin Keh Do Ab Aye Jane Ada, Hum Kya Karein, ..Ye Dil Tum Bin Kahin Lagta Nahin, Hum Kya Karein (Duet Lata Mangeshkar - Laxmikant-Pyarelal/Sahir Ludhianvi) - Izzat 1968" 
 "Ye Duniya Thi Dil Ki (Solo - Shyamji-GhanShyamji/Amrita Pritam) - Daaku 1975"
 "Ye Duniya Woh Duniya Hain (Solo - Jaidev/Naqsh Lyallpuri) - Bhavna 1972"
 "Ye e e e Duniya Pagalon Ka Bazar 2 (Solo - Madan Mohan Kohli) - Chacha Choudhary 1953"
 "Ye Jaan Lo, Yeh Jaan Lo, Pehchaan Lo, Yahaan Kaun Paraya Hain, ..Ye Jaan Lo, Pehchaan Lo, Yahaan Kaun Paraya Hain, Ke Jis Ke Ghar Se Hum Tum Aaye, Ke Jis Ke Ghar Se Hum Tum Aaye, Wahaan Se Har Koi Aaya Hain, Yeh Jaan Lo, Ye Jaan Lo, Pehchaan Lo, Yahaan Kaun Paraya Hain Ye Jaan Lo, Pehchaan Lo, Yahaan Kaun Paraya Hain (Solo - Kalyanji-Anandji/Rajendra Krishan) - Sab Ka Saathi 1972"
 "Ye Jo Ladki Hain Ye Jo Ladka Hain, Ye Jo Ladki Hain, Udti Pawan Si, Haath Lage To, Haath Na Aaye, Ye Jo Ladka Hain, Pahele Deewana, Husn Ko Paana Sikh To Jaye (Duet Lata Mangeshkar - Laxmikant-Pyarelal/Majrooh Sultanpuri) - Bikhre Moti 1971"
 "Ye Kaali Kaali Zulfein (Solo - C. Arjun/Qamar Jalalabadi) - Lambu In Hong Kong 1967"
 "Ye Kaisi Hain (Solo - Sapan-Jagmohan/M. G. Hashmat) - Habari 1978"
 "Ye Kaisi Maine Madhur Madhur Si Aaj Suni Sargam (Godh Bharai Solo - Kalyanji-Anandji/Rajendra Krishan) - Rakhwala 1971"      [Baby Cry ...]
 "Ye Ladka Haaye Allah Kaisaa Hai Diwana Kitna Mushkil Hai Tauba Is Ko Samajhana (Duet Asha Bhosle - R. D. Burman/Majrooh Sultanpuri) - Hum Kisi Se Kum Nahin 1977"
 "Ye Na Hum Se Poochiyein, Mil Gaya Hain Kya Humein, Tum Mile To Mil Gaya, O Tum Mile To Mil Gaya Pyar Ka Khuda Humein, Ye Na Hum Se Poochiyein, Mil Gaya Hain Kya Humein (Waltz Duet Asha Bhosle - Brij Bhushan/Naqsh Lyallpuri) - Purani Pehchaan 1971"  
 "Ye Nadanon ki Duniya (Solo - Naushad Ali/Khumar Barabankvi) - Love and God 1986"
 "Ye Purnur Chehra Yeh Dilkash Ada, Na Hona Ho Khudrat Ki Karigiri Ka, Nahin Tum Se Behtar, Koi Doosara, Na Hona Ho Khudrat Ki Karigiri Ka (Solo - O. P. Nayyar/Shamshul Huda Bihari) - Mohabbat Zindagi Hai 1966" 
 "Ye Pyar Ki Manzil Se Mujhe Kis Ne Sada Di (Duet Suraiya - Hansraj Behl/Rajendra Krishan) - Khiladi 1945"
 "Ye Raat Hain Pyasi Pyasi, Ye Raat Hain Pyasi Pyasi, Pyasi Na Gujar Jaaye, ..Tum Bahon Mein Aa Jaao, Tum Bahon Mein Aa Jaao, Ya Waqt Thaher Jaaye, Ye Raat Hain Pyasi Pyasi (Solo - Kalyanji-Anandji/Kaifi Azmi) - Chhoti Bahu 1971"
 "Ye Sach Hain Koi Kahani Nahin, Khoon Khoon Hota Hain, PAani Nahin (Solo - Laxmikant-Pyarelal/Anand Bakshi) - Amar Akbar Anthony 1977"      [Aa Aa Aa ..Aa Sirf Nata Nahin, Yeh Kuchh Aur Hi Hain, MAa Se Bichad Ke Bhi, Yeh Toot Jata Nahin, ...]
 "Ye Sama, Ye Rutu, Ye Nazare, Dil Mera, Machal Ne Laga, Jane Wafa, Aey Diruba, Aise Mein Aa, Meri Bahon Mein Aa, Rok Le Nigahon Ke Ishare, Tan Mera Pighal Ne Laga, Main Hoon Teri, Tu Hain Mera, Aa Mere Dil Ki Panahon Mein Aa (Diwali Duet Lata Mangeshkar - Ravi/Sahir Ludhianvi) - Do Kaliyan 1968" 
 "Ye Soye Insaan Jaag Uthe 3 (Solo - Laxmikant-Pyarelal/Anand Bakshi) - Hum Paanch 1980"
 "Ye Sun Haaniya (Duet Asha Bhosle - Sonik-Omi/Verma Malik) - Raftaar 1975"
 "Ye Surkh Joda, Ye Badan, Aur Ye Tumhara Baanckpan, Ye Surkh Joda, Ye Badan, Aur Ye Tumhara Baanckpan, Tum Aasmai Hoor Ho, Yaa Ho Farishte Ki Dulhan (Solo - Sapan-Jagmohan/Gauhar Kanpuri) - Shaadi Se Pahle 1980"
 "Ye To Allah Ko Khabar, Yeh To Maula Ko Khabar (Solo Prayer - Kalaynji Anandji/Rajendra Krishan) - Katilon Ka Katil 1981"      [Bhatak Te Dekhe Hai Laakhon Mullah, Karoron Pandi,t Hazaaron SaiAane, Jo Khoob Sochha Samajh Mein Aaya, Khuda Ki Baatein, Khuda Hin Jaane ...]
 "Ye To Kaho Kaun Ho Tum, Meri Bahaar Tumhi To Nahin, Ye To Kaho Kaun Ho Tum, Meri Bahaar Tumhi To Nahin, Pahele Pahel Thahera Hain Dil, Dil Ka Qaraar Tumhi To Nahin, Yes My Darling, Yes My Darling, Yes My Darling, HO O O O (Duet Lata Mangeshkar - Madan Mohan Kohli/Majrooh Sultanpuri) - Akeli Mat Jaiyo 1963"          [Whistle] 
 "Ye Tumharein Raaste Mein (Solo - Daan Singh/Anand Bakshi) - My Love 1970"
 "Ye Zindagi Ke Mele, Duniya Mein Kam Na Honge, Afsos Hum Na Honge (Solo - Naushad Ali/Shakeel Badayuni) - Mela 1948" 
 "Ye Zulf Agar Bikhar Jaaye To Achcha Hai (Solo - Ravi/Sahir Ludhianvi) - Kaajal 1965"  
 "Yeh Aankhein Uff Yun Maa (Duet Lata Mangeshkar - Shankar-JaiKishan/Hasrat Jaipuri) - Jab Pyar Kisi Se Hota Hain 1961"
 "Yeh Aansoo Mere Dil Ki Zubaan Hain, Yeh Aansoo Mere Dil Ki Zubaan Hain, Main Ro-Oon To Ro De Aaansoo, Main Hans Doon To Hans De Aaansoo, Yeh Aansoo Mere Dil Ki Zubaan Hain, Yeh Aansoo Mere Dil Ki Zubaan Hain (Solo - Shankar-Jaikishan/Hasrat Jaipuri) - Humrahi 1963 and Mohammed Rafi Collection Vol. 2 and 5 ****"  
 "Yeh Aasmaan Mubarak Ho, Yeh [???] Mubarak Ho, Sab Ko Eid Mubarak Ho, Eid Ke Din Gale Mil Le Raja (Qawali Manna Dey, Anuradha Paudwal and Krishna Mukherjee) - Teesri Aankh 1982"
 "Yeh Aasmaan Yeh Baadal (Solo - Usha Khanna/Nida Fazil) - Aap To Aise Na The 1980"
 "Yeh Ab Aap Sochiyein (Duet Asha Bhosle - O. P. Nayyar/Majrooh Sultanpuri) - Mere Sanam 1965"
 "Yeh Albela Taur Na Dekha Tum Sa Koi Aur Na Dekha Husn Ka Yeh Jaur Na Dekha Wallah Yaar Loot Gaye Hum To Nazar Mila Ke (Solo - Shankar-Jaikishan/Shailendra) - Sasural 1961"
 "Yeh Albeli Pyar Ki Raahein, Yeh Jaane Pehchane Ruste, Kal Bhi The Yeh Nikhare Nikhare, Aaj Bhi Hain Yeh Hanste Hanste, ..Aa Ha Ha Ha Ha, Yeh Albeli Pyar Ki Raahein, Yeh Jaane Pehchane Ruste, Kal Bhi The Yeh Nikhare Nikhare, Aaj Bhi Hain Yeh Hanste Hanste, ..Aa Ha Ha Ha Ha, Yeh Albeli Pyar Ki Raahein (Duet Lata Mangeshkar - Shankar-Jaikishan/Rajendra Krishan) - Dharti 1970"
 "Yeh Anjaan Rahein, Yeh Manzil Parayi, Mujhe Zindagi Tu, Kahaan Le Ke Aayi, Kahaan Le Ke Aayi, Yeh Anjaan Rahein 1 (Solo - Ratandeep-Hemraaj/Tajdar Taj) - Raakh Aur Chingaari 1982"      [Yeh Anjaan Rahein, Yeh Manzil Parayi, Mujhe Zindagi Tu, Kahaan Le Ke Aayi, Kahaan Le Ke Aayi, ...] 
 "Yeh Anjuman Yeh Khushiyaan, Yeh Rang Yeh Nazarein, Ho Aap Ko Mubarak, Lamhe-E-Pyaar Pyaare, Yeh Anjuman Yeh Khushiyaan, Yeh Rang Yeh Nazarein, Ho Aap Ko Mubarak, Lamhe-E-Pyaar Pyaare, Yeh Anjuman Yeh Khushiyaan 2 (Birthday Solo - Sharda Sinha/Kafil Azar) - Gharibi Hatao 1973"      [Samajhu Apna Tumhein Kyun, Tum Bhi Inhin Mein Ho Shamil, ...]
 "Yeh Ansoo Mere Dil Ki Zuban Hai Main Rou To Ro De Aansoo Main Hans Du To Hans De Ansoo (Solo - Shankar-Jaikishan) - Humrahi 1963"
 "Yeh Baat Hai Kal Sham Ki (Duet Asha Bhosle - O. P. Nayyar) - Basant 1960"      [Ras-te Mein Ik Haseen Aji Mil Gaya Hum Ko Kahin ...]
 "Yeh Baat Hoti Hain Paida Janab (Solo - Kalyanji-Anandji/Anand Bakshi) - Majboor 1964"
 "Yeh Baharon Ke Din, Yeh Suhana Sama, Yeh Suhana Sama, ..Ab To Sun Li Jiye, Pyaar Ki Dastan, ..Ab To Sun Li Jiye, Pyaar Ki Dastan, Yeh Baharon Ke Din O O O O Ha Ha Ha (Duet Lata Mangeshkar - Ghulam Mohammed/Shakeel Badayuni) - Kundan 1955"      [Aa Aa Aa ...]
 "Yeh Bambai Shehar Ka Bada Naam Hain (Solo - Bipin Datta/Noor Devasi) - Kya Yeh Bambai Hain 1959"
 "Yeh Bata Aa Aa Aa Yeh Bata Zindagi Ke Paashbaan (Duet Sarita Devi or Seeta Agarwal - Roshan Lal/Kedar Sharma) - Chhora Chhori 1955"
 "Yeh Bheegi Bheegi Raat Gagan Par, Taaron Ki Baraat Chali, Iss Paar Hain, ..Zara Dil Par Rakh Kar Haath Bata De, Aei Se Mein Yeh Baat, Ke Kitna Pyaar Hain, ..Yeh Bheegi Bheegi Raat Gagan Par, Taaron Ki Baraat Chali, Iss Paar Hain, ..O Zara Dil Par Rakh Kar Haath Bata De, Aei Se Mein Yeh Baat, Ke Kitna Pyaar Hain (Duet Geeta Dutt - Manohar/Akhtar Romani) - Doctor Z [Zed] 1959"
 "Yeh Bheegi Fizayein, Inhin Mein Kho Jaayein, Yeh Bheegi Fizayein, Inhin Mein Kho Jaayein, Zamana Humein Dhoondhe, Hum Kisi Ko Na Mile, Tammanaon Ke Phool, Tanhai Mein Khile, Tammanaon Ke Phool, Tanhai Mein Khile, Yeh Bheegi Fizayein, Inhin Mein Kho Jaayein, Zamana Humein Dhoondhe, Hum Kisi Ko Na Mile (Duet Hemlata - Ravindra Jain/Ravindra Jain) - Kaanch Aur Heera 1972"
 "Yeh Bholi Soorat Wale 1 (Multi S. D. Batish and Rajkumari - Shyam Sundar/Shakeel Badayuni) - Char Din 1949"
 "Yeh Bhool Huyi Bhoole Se Kabhi, Hum Teri Tamanna Kar Baithe (Qawali Solo - Madan Mohan Kohli/Rajendra Krishan) - Fifty Fifty 1956"
 "Yeh Chaand To Mridang Hain, Taare Hain Madire, Yeh Chaand To Mridang Hain, Taare Hain Madire, Yeh Kaun Ga Raha Hain, Yeh Kaun Ga Raha Hain, Mere Man Mein Dhire Dhire, Yeh Chaand To Mridang Hain, Taare Hain Madire (Duet Krishna Kalle or Shyama Hemady - Nandu Pyare/Pt. Madhur) - Shri Krishna-Arjun Yuddha 1971"      [Hun Hun Hun ...]
 "Yeh Chand Yeh Sitaaren Yeh Raat Yaad Rakhna (Qawali Asha Bhosle - Allah Rakha Qureshi) - Laal-E-Yaman 1956"
 "Yeh Chanda Tu Dena Gawahi (Duet Asha Bhosle - N. Dutta) - Holiday In Bombay 1963"
 "Yeh Chehra Hun Hun Hun, Yeh Zulfein Hun Hun Hun, Jadu Sa, Kar Rahe Hain Hey Hey Hey, ..Tauba Tauba Aa Aa, ..Aa Aa Aa Tauba Tauba, ..Tauba Tauba Aa Aa, ..Aa Aa Aa Tauba Tauba, Kandhon Pe Resham Si Julfon Ke Yeh Saayein, Haaye Haaye, Haaye Re Jaan Chali Jaayein Tauba Tauba, ..Tauba Tauba Aa Aa, ..Aa Aa Aa Tauba Tauba, Aise Na Dekho Kasam Se, Sharam Se Aankh Jhuk Jaayein, Haaye Re Saans Ruk Jaayein Tauba Tauba Aa Aa, ..Aa Aa Aa Tauba Tauba (Duet Lata Mangeshkar - Laxmikant-Pyarelal/Anand Bakshi) - Duniya Ka Mela 1974" 
 "Yeh Chehra Yeh Zulfein (Duet Lata Mangeshkar - Laxmikant-Pyarelal/Anand Bakshi) - Duniya Ka Mela 1974"
 "Yeh Chehra Yeh Zulfein (Duet Lata Mangeshkar - Laxmikant-Pyarelal/Anand Bakshi) - Film Hi Film 1983"
 "Yeh Choodiyan Nahin (Solo - R. D. Burman/Anand Bakshi) - Balika Badhu 1976"
 "Yeh College Ka Zamana (Duet Lata Mangeshkar - Shankar-Jaikishan/Rajendra Krishan) - College Girl 1960"
 "Yeh Cycle Ka Chakkar Kabhi Aage Kabhi Peeche, Yeh Cycle Ka Chakkar Kabhi Aage Kabhi Peeche, Kabhi Peeche Kabhi Aage Kabhi Aage Kabhi Peeche, Yeh Cycle Ka Chakkar Kabhi Aage Kabhi Peeche, Kabhi Peeche Kabhi Aage Kabhi Aage Kabhi Peeche, Yeh Cycle Ka Chakkar Kabhi Aage Kabhi Peeche  (Cycle Duet Asha Bhosle - Madan Mohan Kohli/Majrooh Sultanpuru) - Akeli Mat Jaiyo 1963"      [Cycle Ring]     
 "Yeh Deewane Ki Zid Hain (Solo - Jaidev/Sahir Ludhianvi) - Laila Majnu 1976"
 "Yeh Desh Hain Veer Jawanon Ka Albelon Ka Mustanon Ka Yeh Desh Ka Yaaron Kya Kehna Yeh Desh Hain Duniya Ka Gehna (Patriotic Bhangara S. Balbir - O. P. Nayyar/Sahir Ludhianvi) - Naya Daur 1957"      [O O O O O O ...]
 "Yeh Dil Diwana Hain Diwana Hain Yeh Dil (Duet Lata Mangeshkar - S. D. Burman/Anand Bakshi) - Ishq Par Zor Nahin 1970"
 "Yeh Dil Kis Ko Doon, Yeh Dil Kis Ko Doon ..Log Kehte Hain To, Sach Hi Kehte Honge, Log Kehte Hain To, Sach Hi Kehte Honge, Main Hoon Deewana, Dil Hain Mastana, Gham Se Begaana (Solo - Iqbal Qureshi/Qamar Jalalabadi) - Yeh Dil Kis Ko Doon 1963"    
 "Yeh Diwane Ki Zid Hai (Solo - Madan Mohan Kohli) - Laila Majnu 1976"
 "Yeh Do Diwane Dil Ke Chale Hain Mil Ke Chale Hain Chale Hain Chale Hain Sasural (Duet Manna Dey - Kalyanji-Anandji/Qamar Jalalabadi) - Johar Mahmood In Goa 1965"      [Ho O O O O O O Ho O O O O O O ...]
 "Yeh Duniya Aagar Mil Bhi Jaye To Kya Hain (Solo - S. D. Burman/Shair Ludhianvi) - Pyaasa 1957 and Mohammed Rafi Collection Vol. 8 ****"      [Yeh Mehlon Yeh Takhton Yeh Tajon Ki Duniya Yeh Inssan Ke Dushman Samajon Ki Duniya Yeh Daulat Ke Bhukhe Rawajon Ki Duniya ...] 
 "Yeh Duniya Badi Luteri, Na Teri Hain Na Meri, Munh Mein Is Ke Ram Ram, Aur Dil Mein Heraferi, Yeh Duniya Badi Luteri, Na Teri Hain Na Meri, Munh Mein Is Ke Ram Ram, Aur Dil Mein Heraferi, Yeh Duniya Badi Luteri, Na Teri Hain Na Meri (Message Solo - Chitragupt/Rajendra Krishan) - Patang 1960"     
 "Yeh Duniya Do Rangi Hain (Solo - N. Dutta aka Datta Naik/Sahir Ludhianvi) - Chandi Ki Deewar 1964"
 "Yeh Duniya Gol Hain, Oopar Se Khol Hain, Andar Jo Dekho Pyare, Bilkul Pholum Phol Hain (Solo - Ravi/Shakeel Badayuni) - Chaudhahvin Ka Chand 1960"
 "Yeh Duniya Hain Aani Jaani (Duet Asha Bhosle - Nisar Bazmi/Saba Afghani) - Pyara Dushman 1955"
 "Yeh Duniya Ke Badalte Rishte (Multi Kishore Kumar and Suman Kalyanpur - Laxmikant-Pyarelal/Anjaan) - Badalte Rishte 1978"      [Na Ja Ne Kaise Pal Mein Badal ...]
 "Yeh Duniya Khel Tamasha (Duet Asha Bhosle - R. D. Burman/Anand Bakshi) - Lakhon Mein Ek 1971"
 "Yeh Duniya Ki Rail, Musafir Sitara (Solo - Ghulam Mohammad/Shakeel Badayuni) - Sitara 1955"
 "Yeh Duniya Nahin Jagir Kisi Ki Raja Ho Ya Rank Yahaan To Sab Hain Chowkidar Kuch to Aa Kar Chale Gaye Kuch Jaane Ko Taiyaar Khabardar Khabardar (Solo - Madan Mohan Kohli/Rajendra Krishan) - Chowkidar 1974"      [Jiteji Duniya Ko Jalaya Mar Ke Aap Jala Puchho Jaanewale Se Koi Tere Saath Chala ...]
 "Yeh Duniya Paglon Ka Bazar, Yeh Duniya Paglon Ka Bazar, Yeh Duniya Paglon Ka Bazar, Yeh Duniya Paglon Ka Bazar (Background Solo - Madan Mohan Kohli) - Chacha Chaudhary 1953"
 "Yeh Duniya Patang Neet Badale Yeh Rang Koi Jaane Na Udanewala Kaun Hain, Yeh Duniya Patang Neet Badale Yeh Rang Koi Jaane Na Udanewala Kaun Hain 1 (Children Solo - Chitragupt/Rajendra Krishan) - Patang 1960"
 "Yeh Duniya Patang Neet Badale Yeh Rang Koi Jaane Na Udanewala Kaun Hain, Yeh Duniya Patang Neet Badale Yeh Rang Koi Jaane Na Udanewala Kaun Hain 2 (Message Solo - Chitragupt/Rajendra Krishan) - Patang 1960"
 "Yeh Duniya Rail Nirali (Solo - Hemant Kumar/Rajendra Krishan) - Payal 1957"
 "Yeh Duniya Tere Dil Ki Tasveer Baba, Tere Haath Hain Teri Taqdeer Baba (Solo - O. P. Nayyar/Jan Nisar Akhtar) - Shrimati 420"      [O O O O O O ...]
 "Yeh Duniya Toofan Mail (Duet Shyam Kumar - Madan Mohan Kohli/Rajendra Krishan) - Chacha Chowdhary 1953"
 "Yeh Duniya Yeh Duniya (Solo - Shankar-Jaikishan/Shailendra) - Yahudi 1958"
 "Yeh Duniya Yeh Duniya, Haaye Humari Yeh Duniya, Shaitanon Ki Basti Hain, Yahaan Zindagi Sasti Hain, Yeh Duniya Yeh Duniya, Haaye Humari Yeh Duniya, Shaitanon Ki Basti Hain, Yahaan Zindagi Sasti Hain, Yeh Duniya (Solo - Shankar-Jaikishan/Shailendra) - Yahudi 1958"
 "Yeh Duniya Yeh Mehfil Mere Kaam Ki Nahin (Solo - Madan Mohan Kohli/Kaifi Azmi) - Heer Ranjha 1970 and Mohammed Rafi Collection Vol. 7 ****"
 "Yeh Galat Hai Ke Marnewalon Ko Zindagi Se ..Pyar Hain Ek Nishan Kadamon Ka 2 (Solo - R. D. Burman) - Mukti 1977"
 "Yeh Geet Kaun (Duet Anuradha Paudwal - Laxmikant-Pyarelal/Bharat Vyas) - Maan Apmaan 1979"
 "Yeh Gora Gora Mukhda (Duet Geeta Dutt - Kalyanji-Anandji/Prem Dhawan) - Gangu 1962"
 "Yeh Gotey Daar Lahenga, Nikaloo Jab Daal Ke, Duniya Jal Jaye Meri, Matwali Chaal Pe, Jalwe Phir Dekh Gori Meri Bhi Chaal Ke, Choondari Ban Jaye Teri Mere Roomal Se (Duet Asha Bhosle - Naushad Ali/Majrooh Sultanpuri) - Dharam Kanta 1982"
 "Yeh Hain Bombay Meri Jaan (India Duet Geeta Dutt - O. P. Nayyar/Majrooh Sultanpuri) - C. I. D. 1956"      [Aye Dil Hain Mushkil Jeena Yanhan Zara Hatke Zara Bachke ...]
 "Yeh Hain Duniya Ka Bazaar, Yeh Hain Duniya Ka Bazar, Iss Bazar Mein Dekha Hum Ne, Iss Bazar Mein Dekha Hum Ne, Hansne Rone Ka Wyopar, Hansne Rone Ka Wyopar, Kahin Mile Aansoon Ki Ladiyaan, Kahin Mile Aansoon Ki Ladiyaan, Kahin Mile Asha Ke Haar, Kahin Mile Asha Ke Haar, Kahin Dard Kahin Pyaar, Kahin Jeet Hain Kahin Haar, Yeh Hain Duniya Ka Bazar, Yeh Hain Duniya Ka Bazar (Solo - ShyamSundar/Qamar Jalalabadi) - Bazaar 1949"    
 "Yeh Hanste Huye Phool Yeh Mehka Hua Gulshan (Verse Solo - S. D. Burman/Sahir Ludhianvi) - Pyaasa 1957"
 "Yeh Haseen Raat, Yeh Bahaar, Yeh Samaa (Duet Asha Bhosle - Ravi/Shamshul Huda Bihari) - Girls Hostel 1962"
 "Yeh Hasrat Thi Ke Is Duniya Mein Bas Do Kaam Kar Jaate, Tumhari Yaad Mein Jeete Tumhare Gham Mein Mar Jaate (Solo - C. RamChandra/Parwwez Shamsi) - Nausherwan-E-Adil 1957"
 "Yeh Hawa Yeh Mastana Mausam, Dil Ko Phir Qaraar Aaya, Yeh Hawaa Yeh Mastana Mausam, Dil Ko Phir Qaraar Aaya, Jhoom Ban Ke Diwana Aye Dil, Tujh Pe Un Ko Pyaar Aaya, Jhoom Ban Ke Diwana Aye Dil, Tujh Pe Un Ko Pyaar Aaya, Yeh Hawaa Yeh Mastana Mausam (Horse-cart Duet Lata Mangeshkar - Madan Mohan Kohli/Majrooh Sultanpuri) - Akeli Mat Jaiyo 1963"
 "Yeh Ho Kar Rahega (Solo - Hansraj Behl/Verma Malik) - Changez Khan 1957"  
 "Yeh Husn Yeh Ada (Duet Sudha Malhotra - Nirmal Kumar/Sahir Ludhianvi) - Lal Nishan 1959"
 "Yeh Ishq Ishq Hain, ..Kyun Ke Yeh Ishq Ishq Hain 1 (Qawali Multi Manna Dey, S. Batish, Asha Bhosle and Sudha Malhotra - Roshan Lal/Sahir Ludhianvi) - Barsaat Ki Raat 1960"    
 "Yeh Ishq Ishq Hain, ..Kyun Ke Yeh Ishq Ishq Hain 2 (Qawali Solo - Roshan Lal/Sahir Ludhianvi) - Barsaat Ki Raat 1960"    
 "Yeh Jawani Hain, Yeh Jawani Hain Meri Jaan, Dhoom Machane Ke Liye, Nachane Gaane Ke Liye, Mauj Oodane Ke Liye, Hey O O O Ha Ha Ha (Duet Asha Bhosle - Sonik-Omi/Varma Malik) - Heeron Ka Chor 1982"
 "Yeh Jhuke Jhuke Naina, Yeh Lut Balakhati, To Dil Kyun Na Mera, Diwana Ho Tera (Solo - Ravi/Rajendra Krishan) - Bharosa 1963"
 "Yeh Jhukhi Jhukhi Jhukhi Nigahen Teri Yeh Ruki Ruki Ruki Si Aahein Teri (Cha Cha Cha   Solo - Usha Khanna/Rajendra Krishan) - Aao Pyar Karen I 1964"
 "Yeh Jo Chilman Hain, Dushman Hain Humari, O O O Yeh Jo Chilman Hain, Dushman Hain Humari, Kitni Sharmili Haan Kitni Sharmili Dulhan Hain Humari, Yeh Jo Chilman Hain (Solo - Laxmikant-Pyarelal/Anand Bakshi) - Mehboob Ki Mehndi 1971"
 "Yeh Jo Nazarein Jhukayein Jaate Hain (Qawali Solo - Roshan Lal/Khumar Barabankvi) - Do Roti 1957"      [Choron Ki Tarah Chupke Chupke, Tanahai Mein Jaa Ke Peete Hain, Aei Se Bhi Hain Peene Wale Jo, Yaaron Se Chhupa Ke, Hain Wah, Yaaron Se Chhupa Ke Peete Hain, Yaaron Se Chhupa Ke Peete Hain, Yaaron Se Chhupa Ke Peete Hain, Aei Se Bhi Hain Peene Wale Jo, Yaaron Se Chhupa Ke, Wuy Wuy, Yaaron Se Chhupa Ke Peete Hain ...]   
 "Yeh Kaise Duniya Wale Hain (Solo - Shyamji-Ghanshyamji/Kulwant Jani-Mohsin Nawab-Sajan Dehlvi-Upendra) - Teen Chehre 1979 and Evergreen Mohd Rafi ****"
 "Yeh Kaise Yog Liya Sarkar Main Ne Sarkar (Duet Geeta Dutt - Lachhiram Tamar/P. Gaafil) - Guru Ganthal 1956" 
 "Yeh Kaisi Deewar Hain Duniya Apne Nahin Mil Paate Hain, Yeh Kaisi Deewar Hain Duniya Apne Nahin Mil Paate Hain, Zulm To Yeh Hain Saath Zammen Ke, Dil Bhi Yahaan Bat Jaate Hain (Solo - S. Madan/Majrooh Sultanpuri) - Batwara 1961" 
 "Yeh Kaisi Main Ne (Solo - Kalyanji-Anandji/Rajendra Krishan) - Rakhwala 1971"
 "Yeh Khamoshiyan Yeh Tanhaiyan, Mohobbat Ki Duniya Hain, Kitni Jawaan, Yeh Khamoshiyan Yeh Tanhaiyan, Mohobbat Ki Duniya Hain, Kitni Jawaan, Yeh Khamoshiyan Yeh Tanhaiyan, Aa Aa Aa ..Ho Ho Ho (Duet Asha Bhosle - Ravi/Rajendra Krishan) - Yeh Raaste Hai Pyar Ke 1963"
 "Yeh Khidki Jo Band Rahti (Solo - Laxmikant-Pyarelal/Anand Bakshi) - Main Tulsi Tere Aangan Ki 1978"
 "Yeh Kisi Ki Ankhon Ka Noor Ho Tum (Solo - Ghulaam Mohammed) - Pakeezah Rang Barang 1977"
 "Yeh Kya Andher Hain ..Ho ..Yeh Kya Andhere Hain Bhagwan Tere Dwarkhane Mein, Kaho Kya Hoga Hum Sa Insaan Yeh Saare Zamane Mein (Duet Fun Prayer Unknown - Sardul Kwatra/M. A. Taj) - Jalate Deep 1950" [Haan Aa Aa ..Museebat Itni Jheli Hain, Ke Batlaayi Nahin Jati, Haaye Re Bhagwan, Ke Ek Khoti Chawwani, Jeb Mein, Payi Nahin Jaati, ..Aa Aa Aa Haaye Bhagwan ...]   
 "Yeh Kya Zindagi Hain Samajh Mein Na Aaye Kabhi Ro Diye Hum Kabhi Muskuraye, Yeh Kya Zindagi Hain Samajh Mein Na Aaye Kabhi Ro Diye Hum Kabhi Muskuraye, Yeh Kya Zindagi Hain (Solo - Shyamji Ghanshyam Ji) - Heroine Ek Raat Ki 1979"
 "Yeh Ladka Hain Allah Kaisa Hain Deewana (Duet Asha Bhosle - R. D. Burman/Majrooh Sultanpuri) - Hum Kisi Se Kum Naheen 1977"
 "Yeh Laherate Yeh Balakhate Raaste (Multi Trilok Kapoor and Uma Devi aka TunTun - Sardul Kwatra/Deena Nath Madhok) - Goonj 1952"
 "Yeh Lucknow Ki Sar Zameen, Yeh Rang Roop Ka Chaman (India Solo - Ravi/Shakeel Badayuni) - Chaudhvin Ka Chand 1960"     
 "Yeh Maana Dil Jise Dhoonde (Solo - Chitragupt/Majrooh Sultanpuri) - Zimbo 1958"
 "Yeh Mard Bade Dil Sard Bade Bedard Chalo Ji Mana, Mardon Ka Phir Bhi Hain Zamana 2 (Solo - Hemant Kumar/Rajindra Krishan) - Miss Mary 1957"
 "Yeh Mausam Bheega Bheega Hain, Hawa Bhi Jada Jada Hain, Kyun Na Machlega Dil Mera, Tum Ko Pane Ka Irada Hain, Yeh Mausam Bheega Bheega Hain, Hawa Bhi Jada Jada Hain Kyun Na Machlega Dil Mera, Tum Ko Pane Ka Irada Hain, Yeh Mausam Bheega Bheega Hain, Hawa Bhi Jada Jada Hain Kyun Na Machlega Dil Mera, Tum Ko Pane Ka Irada Hain, Yeh Mausam Bheega Bheega Hain (Duet Lata Mangeshkar - Shankar-Jaikishan/Hasrat Jaipuri) - Dharti 1970"      [Aa Aa Aa ..O O O ..O O O ...]
 "Yeh Mehfil Yeh Botal (Solo - Ravi/Shamshul Huda Bihari) - Issi Ka Naam Duniya Hain 1962"
 "Yeh Mera Prem Patra Padhakar, Ke Tum Naraz Na Hona Ke Tum Meri Zindagi Ho Ke Tum Meri Bandagi Ho (Solo - Shankar-Jaikishan/Shailendra) - Sangam 1964"      [Meh-erbaan Likhoon, Haseena Likhoon, Ya Dilruba Likhoon, Hairaan Hoon Ki Aap Ko Iss Khat Mein Kya Likhoon, ...]
 "Yeh Motor Ki Far Far (Solo - Aziz Hindi/Manohar Khanna) - Dhoop Chhaon 1954" 
 "Yeh Mungh Masoor Ki Daal (Duet Asha Bhosle - Vinod/Madhup Sharma) - Shri Naqad Narayan 1955"
 "Yeh Na Hoga (Multi Asha Bhosle and Kamal Barot - N. Dutta aka Datta Naik/Anand Bakshi) - Khakaan 1965"
 "Yeh Na Thi Humari Qismat, Ke Visaal E Yaar Hota, Agar Aur Jeete Rehte, Yahin Intezaar Hota (Urdu Ghazal Solo - Khaiyyaam/Mirza Ghalib) - Yaadgaar Ghazalein Vol. 1 **** and This Is Mohd Rafi Saab -Ghazala And Bhajans **** and A Journey With Begum Akhtar **** or Mirza Ghalib ****"
 "Yeh Naach Vaach Kya Hain, Iddiyap Iddiyap Iddiyap Papa Iddiyap Iddiyap Iddiyap Ya, Yeh Naach Vaach Kya Hain, Yeh Kya Gana Bajana, Kuch Pagalone Bana Di Mehfil Paagal-Khana Iddiyap Iddiyap Iddiyap Papa Iddiyap Iddiyap Iddiyap Ya (Twist Duet Unknown - Kalyanji-Anandji/Prakash Mehra) - Ek Haseena Do Diwane 1972"      [Hey Boy .. Hey Boy .. Boy O Boy .. [Laughing] Lovely Boy Lovely ... Kuchh Ladke, Kuchh Ladakiyon Ki Huyi Ikkathi Bheed, Aisa Nacha Naach Ke Bhaiya, Ho Gayi Man Ko Peed, Ho Gayi Man Ko Peed, Hua Dil Bada Udasa, Baap Bajaye Saaz, To Bitiya Hain Rakaasa ...]
 "Yeh Nayan Kyun Sharma Gaye (Duet Shamshad Begum - Hanuman Prasad/Gafil Harnalvi) - Rasili 1946"
 "Yeh Parbaton Ke Daayre, Yeh Shyaam Ka Dhuaan, Aise Na Kyun Chhed De, Dilon Ki Dastaan (Waltz Duet Lata Mangeshkar - Chitragupt/Sahir Ludhianvi) - Vaasna 1968"
 "Yeh Parda Hata Do Jara Mukhada Dikha Do Hum Pyar Karnewale Hai Koi Gair Nahin (Duet Asha Bhosle - Ravi) - Ek Phool Do Mali 1969"
 "Yeh Phoolon Ka Mausam Yeh Thandi Hawayein (Duet Shamshad Begum - Govind Ram/Bharat Vyas) - Jeevan Nauka 1952"
 "Yeh Powder Yeh Surkhiyan (Duet Asha Bhosle - Ravi/Majrooh Sultanpuri) - Pehli Raat 1959" 
 "Yeh Pyar Ka Halla Gulla (Duet Geeta Dutt - N. Dutta aka Datta Naik/Asad Bhopali) - Awara Abdulla 1963"
 "Yeh Pyar Ka Jhagda Hain To Pyar Se Tai Ki Jiye Bimar-E-Mohobbat Ko Aisi Na Saza Dijiye (Solo - N. Dutta or Datta Naik/Noor Devasi) - Aag Aur Daag 1971" 
 "Yeh Raat Aashiqana, Chhaya Sama Suhana, Nazare Milanewale, Dil Bhi Zara Milana (Cha Cha Cha Asha Bhosle - O. P. Nayyar/Jan Nisar Akhtar) - Naya Andaz 1956"
 "Yeh Raat Bahut Rangeen Sahi (Solo - Khayyam/Sahir Ludhianvi) - Shagoon 1964"
 "Yeh Raat Yeh Fizayein Phir Aaye Na Aaye, Aao Shama Bujha Ke, Hum Aaj Dil Jalayein (Waltz Asha Bhosle - S. Madan/Majrooh Sultanpuri) - Batwara 1961"  
 "Yeh Raat Yeh Nazarein Aa Jao Aa Bhi Jao (Duet Suraiya  - Husnlal-Bhagatram/Sarshar Sailani) - Trolley Driver 1958"
 "Yeh Rang Bharein Baadal (Duet Asha Bhosle - Ravi/asad Bhopali) - Tu Nahin Aur Sahin 1960" 
 "Yeh Rang Na Chhutega Ulfat Ki Nishani Hai (Asha Bhosle - Ravi/Majrooh Sultanpuri) - China Town 1962"
 "Yeh Ras Teri Baton Ka Chocolate, Yeh Gaz Tere Ankhon Ka Omlet, Yeh Ghera Teri Zulfon Ka Baby or Meri Dil Ko Gaya Lapet (Twist Solo - Chitragupt/Rajendra Krishan) - Ghar Basa Ke Dekho 1963"
 "Yeh Reshmi Zulfein Yeh Sharbati Aankhen Innhe Dekh Kar Jee Rahe Hain Sabhi (Solo - Laxmikant-Pyarelal/Anand Bakshi) - Do Raaste 1969 and Zindagi Ka Safar - Rajesh Khanna ****"
 "Yeh Roza Yeh Roze Ki Shaan (Solo - Iqbal Qureshi/A. H. Rizvi) - Shaan E Khudaa 1971"
 "Yeh Sach Hain Aye Jahan-Walon Humein Jeena Nahin Aaya (Solo - Gajanan/Shailendra) - Kal Hamara Hai 1959"
 "Yeh Sama, Yeh Rut, Yeh Nazare, Dil Mera Machal Ne Laga, Jaane Wafa, Aye Dil-Ruba, Aise Mein Aa, Mere Bahon Mein Aa, Rok Le Nigahon Ke Isharein, Tan Mera Pighal Ne Laga, Main Hoon Teri, Tu Hain Mera, Aa Mere Dil Ki Panahon Mein Aa (Duet Lata Mangeshkar - Ravi/Sahir Ludhianvi) - Do Kaliyaan 1968"
 "Yeh Sar Rahein Naa Tan Rahein (Patriotic Duet Asha Bhosle - Hafiz Khan/Shewan Rizvi) - Watan 1954" 
 "Yeh Shaam Hain Dhuan 1 (Solo - Brij Bhushan/Naqsh Lyallpuri) - Ek Nao Do Kinare 1973"
 "Yeh Shaam Hain Dhuan 2 (Duet Asha Bhosle - Brij Bhushan/Naqsh Lyallpuri) - Ek Nao Do Kinare 1973"
 "Yeh Shama To Jali, Roshni Ke Liye, Iss Shama Se Kahin Aaag, Lag Jaaye To, Yeh Shama Kya Karein, Yeh Shama To Jali, Roshni Ke Liye, Iss Shama Se Kahin Aaag, Lag Jaaye To, Yeh Shama Kya Karein, Yeh Hawaa To Chali, Saans Le Le Har Koi, Ghar Kisi Ka, Oojad Jaye Aandhi Mein, Yeh Hawaa Kya Karein, (Piano Solo - Laxmikant-Pyarelal/Anand Bakshi) - Aya Sawan Jhoom Ke 1969"
 "Yeh Shehar Hain Bambai (India Solo - S. Mohinder/Bharat Vyas) - Do Dost 1960"
 "Yeh Shokh Sitarein Ik Shokh Nazar Ki Tarah (Duet Lata Mangeshkar - Vinod/Aziz Kashmiri) - Ek Thi Ladki 1949"
 "Yeh Shor Hain Gali Gali Ke Woh Jawan Ho Chali (16th Birthday Solo - Jaidev/Sarshar Sailani) - Ek Thi Reeta 1971"      [Hazaron Aap Se Le Kar, Kisi Boodh Par Shabab Aaya, Jo Aaya Bhi To Yun Aaya, Ke Zalim Pe Hisaab Aaya, Haaye ...]
 "Yeh Surkhiyan Yeh Laaliyan (Multi Ghulam Mohammad and Asha Bhosle - C. Arjun/Verma Malik) - Guru Aur Chela 1973"
 "Yeh Taaro Bhari Raat Humein Yaad Rahegi (Duet Geeta Roy - Chitragupt/Anjum Jaipuri) - Hamari Shaan 1951"
 "Yeh Tera Husn Nasha Hain Magar Khumar Nahin (Solo - Madan Mohan Kohli/Rajendra Krishan) - Kaise Kategi Zindagi 2011" (Previously Unreleased)
 "Yeh Teri Saadgi Yeh Tera Baankpan Jaane Bahar Jaane Chaman Tauba Shikan Tauba Shikan (Solo - Usha Khanna/Javed Anwar) - Shabnam 1964 and Down Memory Lane -Mohammad Rafi ****"
 "Yeh Thundi Hawa Yeh Rangeen Sama NusNus Mein Pyar Samaya (Duet Chandrani Mukherjee - Vistas Ardeshir Balsara/Prahlad Sharma) - Pyar 1969"
 "Yeh To Mumkin Hi Nahin Hain, Saqiya Itni Pila De Ke Mahek Jaoon Main (Solo - KamalaKant/Naqsh Lyallapuri) - Jai Jwala 1972"
 "Yeh To Pattharon Ka Shehar Hain, Yahaan Kis Ko Apna Banayiyein 2 (Solo - Usha Khanna/Irshad) - Pattharon Ka Shaher 1972"      [Jo Zuban-E-Dil Na Samajh Sake, Jo Na Keh Sake Kabhi Dil Ki Baat, Wahin Booth Hain Har Suni Raah Mein, Jahaan Dekhiye Jahaan Jayiye, Thi Nazar Ki Chaah Ki Arzoo, Yehin Ek Apni Thi Justjoo, ...]
 "Yeh Vaada Raha Dilruba (Waltz Duet Asha Bhosle - Kalyanji-Anandji/Rajinder Krishan) - Professor Pyarelal 1981 and A Treasure Revealed 2012"      [Tere Siwa Na Kisi Ka Banoonga ...]
 "Yeh Vedo Ki Hain Vaani, Santon Se Mukha Se Jaani, Jo Sasu Ki Seva Kar Ti, Dhanya Dhanya Woh Bahu-Rani (Solo - Jeetu-Tapan/Vishweshawar Sharma) - Sampoorna Sant Darshanam 1978"      [O O O O O O ...] 
 "Yeh Wadiyan Yeh Fizayen Bula Rahin Hain Tumhein, Khamoshiyon Ki Sadayen Bula Rahin Hain Tumhen (Outdoor - Ravi Shankar Sharma / Sahir Ludhianvi) - Aaj Aur Kal II 1963"
 "Yeh Zameen Hain Do Dilon Ke Pyar Ki, Mil Gayee Gali Gali Bahar Ki, Jab Se Tum Se Mast Aankhen Chaar Ki Mil Gayee Zindagi Qarar Ki Pyar Ki, Pyar Ki, Pyar Ki, Pyar Ki (Duet Asha Bhosle - Malay Chakraborty/Munir Arzoo Kazmi) - Mukti 1960"  
 "Yeh Zindagi Ka Mausam Aur Yeh Samaan Suhana Aao Yahin Bana Le Dum Bhar Ko Aashiyana (Duet Asha Bhosle - Ravi/Shakeel Badayuni) - Ghunghat 1960"
 "Yeh Zindagi Ke Raaste (Solo - Iqbal Qureshi/Rajendra Krishan) - Love In Simla 1960" 
 "Yeh Zindagi Kitni Haseen Hain (Swing Solo - Ravi/Rajendra Krishan) - Yeh Zindagi Kitni Hassen Hai 1966"      [Pahle Aankh Ladayiye, Phir Aaage Badh Jayiye, Badh Kar Haath Milayiye, Apna Naam Batayiye, Pehloo Mein Jum Jayiye, Phir Bhi Woh Na Pyar Karein, To Peeche Hi Pad Jayiye, Mohabbat Rang Layegi, Haseena Maan Jayegi, Kisi Se Pyar Kar Ke Dekhiye, ...]
 "Yeh Zulf Agar Khul Ke Bikhar Jaye To Achha, Yeh Zulf Agar Khul Ke Bikhar Jaye To Achha, Iss Raat Ki Taqdeer Sanwar Jaaye To Achha (Solo - Ravi) - Kajal 1965 and Mohammed Rafi Collection Vol. 6 ****"
 "Yeh Zulf Kaisi Hain, Zanzeer Jaisi Hain, Yeh Zulf Kaisi Hain, Zanzeer Jaisi Hain, Woh Kaisi Hogi, Jis Ki Tasveer Aisi Hain, ..Yeh Aankh Kaisi Hain, Haay Teer Jaisi Hain, Yeh Aankh Kaisi Hain, Haaye Teer Jaisi Hain, Woh Kaisa Hoga, Jis Ki Tasveer Aisi Hain (Duet Lata Mangeshkar - Laxmikant-Pyarelal/Anand Bakshi) - Piya Ka Ghar 1972"
 "Yehi Armaan Le Kar Aaj Apne Ghar Se Hum Nikale Jahaan Hain Zindagi Apni Usi Kuchhe Mein Dum Nikale (Solo - Naushad Ali/Shakeel Badayuni) - Shabab 1954"   
 "Yehi Hain Duniya Teri Bhagwan (Duet Madhubala Zaveri - Hansraj Behl/Prem Dhawan) - Resham 1952"
 "Yehi Hain Tamanna Tere Dar Ke Samne Meri Jaan Jayen Meri Jaan Jayen (Solo - Madan Mohan Kohli/Raja Mehdi Ali Khan) - Aap Ki Parchchaiyan 1964"
 "Yehi Hain Woh Sanjh Aur Savera Jis Ke Liye Tadpa Hum Sara Jivan Bhar (Duet Asha Bhosle - Shankar-Jaikishan/Hasrat Jaipuri) - Sanjh Aur Savera 1964"
 "Yehi To Hai Woh Yehi To Hain Dekhiye Dekhiye Aur Gaur Se (Solo - S. D. Burman/Majrooh Sultanpuri) - Solva Saal 1958"     
 "Yehi Yehi Jadoobhari Meethi Meethi Taan (Solo - Sardar Malik/Bhrat Vyas) - Saranga 1960"
 "Yoon Hi Ulfat Ke Maaron Par (Duet  Shamshad Begum - S. N. Tripathi/Ramesh Chandra Pandey) - Aladdin Aur Jadui Chirag 1952"
 "Yug Yug Se Gaate Aaye Hain (Solo - Lala Asar Sattar/B. D. Mishra) - Jahan Sati Wahan Bhagwan 1965"
 "Yug Yug Se Hai Saath Humara Amar Prem Hain Apna Bolo Haan Bolo Naa Bolo Haan (Duet Jyoti Matwankar - RatanDeep-Hemraaj/P. L. Sawant) - Shaitan Mujrim 1980"
 "Yun Bekhudi Se KAam Liya Hain Kabhi Kabhi (Ghazal - Ananda Shankar and Reminder Kaushal) - Ghazal - Mohammed Rafi By SAREGAMA ****"      [Aa Aa Aa ...]
 "Yun Chaal Chalo Na Matwali Iss Dil Mein Kayamat Aati Hain (Funny Duet I. S. Johar - Sonik-Omi/G. L. Rawal) - Dil Ne Phir Yaad Kiya 1966" 
 "Yun Hans Hans Kar (Duet Asha Bhosle - S. D. Burman/Majrooh Sultanpuri) - Dr. Vidya 1962"
 "Yun Hi Tum Mujh Se Baat Karti Ho Ya Koi Pyaar Ka Irada Hain (Duet Lata Mangeshkar - Kalyanji-Anandji/Indeevar or Qamar Jalalabadi) - Sachcha Jhootha 1970"
 "Yun Muskura Ke Samane Aaya Naa Kijiye (Duet Asha Bhosle - O. P. Nayyar/Jan Nisar Akhtar) - Qaidi 1957"
 "Yun Na Chhedo Balam Koi aa Jaayein (Duet Asha Bhosle - Nisar Bazmi/Saba Afghani) - Halla Gulla 1954"
 "Yun Na Dekho, Yun Na Dekho Hamen Baar Baar, Ho Na Jaye, Ho Na Jaye Kahin Hum Se Pyar (Solo - Kalyanji-Anandji/Qamar Jalalabadi) - Preet Na Jane Reet 1964"
 "Yun Na Humein Dekhiyein (Duet Suman Kalyanpur - Sardar Malik/Hasrat Jaipuri) - Jantar Mantar 1964"
 "Yun Na Sharma Phailade Apni Gori Gori Baahein .. Are Hansne-walon Jo Jiye Bhi Socho, Jinhein Pyaar Milta Nahin, Jeete Hain Kaise (Duet Kishore Kumar - Madan Mohan Kohli/Kaifi Azmi) - Parwana 1971"      [Ae Ae Ae Ae ..O O O ..Lu La Lu La ...]
 "Yun Rootho Na Haseena Meri Jaan Pe Ban Jayegi (Solo - Madan Mohan Kohli/Rajendra Krishan) - Neend Hamari Khwab Tumhare 1966"
 "Yun To Aapas Mein Bigad Te Hain Khapa Hot Hain, Milnewale Kahin, Milnewale Kahin Ulfat Mein Juda Hote Hain (Duet Lata Mangeshkar - Naushad Ali/Majrooh Sultanpuri) - Andaz 1949" (Rafi Sings For Raj Kapoor)

Z 

(89)

 "Zaalim Kehna Maan (Duet Geeta Dutt - Chitragupt/Majrooh Sultanpuri) - Baraat 1960"
 "Zaalim Teri Ada Mere Dil (Duet Lata Mangeshkar - Khayyam/Hasrat Jaipuri) - Bambai Ki Billi 1960"
 "Zaban E Yaar Man Turki (Qawali Asha Bhosle - O. P. Nayyar/Shevan Rizvi) - Ek Musafir Ek Haseena 1962"      [Teri Talash Mujh Ko Layi Kahan Kahan Se, Sun Le Mera Fasana Ab To Meri Jubaan Se, Maine Wahin Wahin Par Saj De Kiye Hain Tujh Ko, Zulfon Ko Tu Udati Gujri Jahan Jahan Se, Iran Hum Ne Dekha, Dekha Hain Chin Hum Ne, Lekin Kahin Na Dekha Tujh Sa Haseen Hum Ne, Koi Bhi Chak Na Paya Tere Muqabale Ka Aawaaz Tujh Ko Di Hain O Nazneen Hum Ne O Yaar Zulfon Wale ...] 
 "Zahe Kismat Teri Mehfil Se Jo Paigam Aaya Hain (Solo - Hanuman Prasad/M. K. Chibbar) - Jannat 1949"
 "Zahe Kismat Teri Mehfil Se Jo Paigam Aaya Hain (Solo - Hanuman Prasad/M. K. Chhibbar) - Jannat 1949"
 "Zakhmi Hain Pao Mere Manzil Bhi Door Hai Teri Khushi Ke Liye Ye Bhi Manzur Hai (Duet Asha Bhosle - S. Mohinder/Tanveer Naqvi) - Alladin Ka Beta 1955"
 "Zamaana Pyar Ka Mausam Bahar Ka (Duet Asha Bhosle - Ravi/Majrooh Sultanpuri) - Pehli Raat 1959" 
 "Zamaane Ki Aakhon Ne Dekha Hain Yaaron, Zamane Ki Ankhon Ne Dekha Hain Yaaron, Sada Apni Duniya Mein Aisa Nazara, Kabhi Un Ko Phoolon Se Pooja Hain Sab Ne, Kabhi Un Ko Patthar Se Mara, Zamane Ki Ankhon Ne Dekha Hain Yaaron (Message Solo - O. P. Nayyar/Shamshul Huda Bihari) - Ek Baar Muskura Do 1972"      [Nafrat Se Jinhein Dekhte Ho, Tum Marte Ho Jinko Thokar, Kya Un Pe Un Pe Gujarati Hain Dekho, Ek Baar Kabhi Ghayal Ho Kar, ...]
 "Zamaane Ne Maare Jawan Kaise Kaise, Zameen Kha Gayi Aasmaan Kaise Kaise 1 (Solo - R. D. Burman/Majrooh Sultanpuri) - Baharon Ke Sapne 1967 and Mohammed Rafi Collection Vol. 9 ****"
 "Zamaane Ne Maare Jawan Kaise Kaise, Zameen Kha Gayi Aasmaan Kaise Kaise 2 (Solo - R. D. Burman/Majrooh Sultanpuri) - Baharon Ke Sapne 1967"
 "Zamana Ho Gaya Fariyad Karte, Zamana Ho Gaya Fariyaad Karte, Kis Bichhade Huye Ko Yaad Karte, Zamana Ho Gaya Fariyaad Karte (Solo - Hansraj Behl/Kaif Irfani) - Shaan 1950"
 "Zamana Jo Ankhen Dikhata Hain Tujh Ko (Solo - Sardul Kwatra/Sarshar Sailani) - Man Ka Meet 1950"
 "Zameen Bhi Wahi Hain, Wahin Aasmaan, Magar Ab Woh Dilli Ki Galiyaan Kahaan (Solo - Roshan Lal/Majrooh Sultanpuri-Saifuddin Saif) - Chandni Chowk 1954"
 "Zameen Se (Pe) Humein Aasmaan Par, Bitha Ke Gira To Na Doge ..Agar Hum Yeh Pooche Ke Dil Mein, Basa Ke Bhoola To Na Doge (Waltz Duet Asha Bhosle - Madan Mohan Kohli/Rajendra Krishan) - Adalat II 1958"      [Aa Aa Aa ...]
 "Zara Aankhiyan La Laiye, O Yara Khushiya Mana Laiye (Solo - R. D. Burman/Majrooh Sultanpuri) - Parchhaiyan 1972"
 "Zara Bach Ke (Duet Asha Bhosle - Kalyanji-Anandji/Verma Malik) - Ek Se Badhkar Ek 1976"
 "Zara Bach Ke Chalna, Zara Hat Ke Chalna, Yeh Shahi Khatara Chala Aa Raha Hain (Car Duet Asha Bhosle - Bipin Datta/Noor Devasi) - Kya Yeh Bambai Hain 1959"   
 "Zara Dekh Idhar, Zara Dekh Dekh Dekh Idhar, ..Tu Tu Baba Ki Dar, ..Zara Dekh Idhar, Zara Dekh Dekh Dekh Idhar, Tum Ko Kahin, Kehti Hain Kya, Meri Nazar, Ye Meri Nazar, ..Lagta Hain Dar, Kahin Tirchi Nazar, Lag Jaaye Na Idhar, Main Jaaoonga Ghar, Zara Dekh Udhar Yaah, Zara Dekh Dekh Dekh Idhar (Duet Geeta Dutt - Bulo C. Rani/Pyare Lal Santoshi) - Badshah Salamat 1956" 
 "Zara Idhar To Aa Matwali ..Palat Zara Tera Dhyan Kidhar Balle (Bhangara Asha Bhosle - S. D. Batish/Qamar Jalalabadi) - Saazish 1959"      [O O O O O O ..Aaye ..O Bachke ..Balle Balle Balle ...]
 "Zara Is Anadi Ki Himmat To Dekho (Multi Asha Bhosle and Sharda Sinha - Datta Naik/Shamshul Huda Bihari-Khalik-Aziz Kasmiri-Shad Fidayi) - Ganga 1974"
 "Zara Jhoom Le, Zara Jhoom Le Jawani Ka Zamana Hain (Duet Geeta Roy - S. D. Burman/Sahir Ludhianvi) - NauJawan 1951"      [O O O O O O ..O Jhanak Jhanan Jhanan Jhanan O Chini-Mini Chini-Mini Chni-Mini, O Jhanak Jhanan Jhanan Jhanan O Chini-Mini Chini-Mini Chni-Mini Are O Sun Le Sun Le ...]
 "Zara Mann Ki Kewadiya Khol, Sainyaa Tore Dware Khade (Solo - Naushad Ali/Shakeel Badayuni) - Kohinoor 1960"      [Koi Pyaar Ke Pankh Pasare ...]
 "Zara Mud Ke To Dekh (Solo - Kalyanji-Anandji/Kulwant Jani) - Lalkaar 1972"
 "Zara Rakhna Bharosa Bhagwan Mein (Prayer Solo - N. Dutta aka Datta Naik/Kavi Pradeep) - Dusshera 1956"
 "Zara Ruk Ja, Pyare Ruk Ja, Aans Lagaye Baithe Hain Rahon Mein Kab Se Hum (Cycle Business Solo - S. D. Burman/Majrooh Sultanpuri) - Sitaron Se Aage 1958 and Down Memory Lane -Mohammad Rafi ****"
 "Zara Sambhal Ke Beta (Solo - Ghulam Mohammad/Shakeel Badayuni) - Hazaar Raatein 1953"
 "Zara Samne to Aao Chhaliye, Chhup Chhup Chalne Mein Kya Raaj Hain, Yun Chupana Sakega Parmatma, Meri Atma Ki Yeh Awaz Hain (Duet Lata Mangeshkar - Shri Nath Tripathi/Bharat Vyas) - Janam Janam Ke Phere 1957"
 "Zara Si Aur Pila Do Bhang (Duet Asha Bhosle - Ravi/Sahir Ludhianvi) - Kaajal 1965"
 "Zara Si Baat Pyaar Ki Zaban Se Nikal Gayi Huzoor Kya Khata Huyi Nigah Kyun Badal Gayi (Swing Piano Duet Suman Kalyanpur - Ravi/Asad Bhopali) - Salaam Mem Saab 1961"      [Shukriya ...]
 "Zara Sun Haseena E Naazani, Mera Dil Tujhi Pe Nissar Hain, Tere Dum Pe Hi Meri Dilruba Meri Zindagi Mein Bahaar Hain (Solo - Ravi/Shakeel Badayuni) - Kaun Apna Kaun Paraya 1963"
 "Zara Sun To Lo Haseena (Duet Asha Bhosle - S. Mohinder/Sarshar Sailani) - Sun Le To Haseena 1958"
 "Zara Thehro Ji, Zara Thehro Ji Abdul Gaffar, Rumal Mera Le Ke Jana ..O Gori Hum Ko Bhi Tum Se Hain Pyar Rumal Humein De Ke Jana (Business Duet Suman Kalyanpur - Kalyanji-Anandji/Hasrat Jaipuri) - Satta Bazar 1959"      [Ae Aa ...]
 "Zara Tum Ne Dekha To Pyar Aa Gaya (Duet Lata Mangeshkar - Husnlal-Bhagatram/Kaif Irfani) - Jal Tarang 1949"
 "Zara Zara Si Baat Pe (Solo - Kalyanji-Anandji/Anand Bakshi) - Phool Bane Angarey 1963"
 "Zikar Us Pariwash Ka Aur Phir Bayaan Apna  (Urdu Ghazal Solo - Khaiyyam Sharmaji/Mirza Ghalib) - Yaadgaar Ghazalein Vol. 1 **** and Rafi Aye Jaan E Ghazal **** or Ghazal ****"      [Aa Aa Aa ...]
 "Zinda Hain Zinda Hum Se (Duet Suman Kalyanpur - Chitragupt/Majrooh Sultanpuri) - Ramu Dada 1961"
 "Zindabad Zindabad Ae Mohabbat Zindabad (Message Solo - Naushad Ali/Shakeel Badayuni) - Mughal-E-Azam 1959 and Mughal-E-Azam In Colour 2004"      [Wafa Ki Raah Mein Aashiq Ki Eid Hoti Hai ...]
 "Zindagi Aaj Mere Naam Se Sharmati Hain, Zindagi Aaj Mere Naam Se Sharmati Hain, Apni Halat Pe Mujhe Khud Bhi Hansi Aati Hain (Solo - Naushad Ali/Shakeel Badayuni) - Son Of India 1962"
 "Zindagi Ab To Tere Naam Se Dar Lagta Hain, Zindagi Ab To Tere Naam Se Dar Lagta Hain, Sari Duniya Mujhe Ik Maut Ka Ghar Lagta Hain, Zindagi Ab To Tere Naam Se Dar Lagta Hain (Solo - Laxmikant-Pyarelal/Rajendra Krishan) - Shaandar 1974"
 "Zindagi Bhar Gham Judaai Ka Mujhe Tadapayega (Solo - Hansraj Behl/Asad Bhopali) - Miss Bombay 1957"
 "Zindagi Bhar Ka Razdar Gaya (Duet Suman Kalyanpur) - Kawwali Ki Raat 1964"      [Dil Gaya Dil Ka Aitbar Gaya ...]
 "Zindagi Bhar Nahiin Bhoolegi Yeh Barsaat Ki Raat 1 (Solo - Roshan Lal/Sahir Ludhianvi) - Barsaat Ki Raat 1960"
 "Zindagi Bhar Nahiin Bhoolegi Yeh Barsaat Ki Raat 2 (Duet Lata Mangeshkar - Roshan Lal/Sahir Ludhianvi) - Barsaat Ki Raat 1960"
 "Zindagi Bhar Nahin Bhoolegi Yeh Barsaat Ki Raat 3 (Solo - Roshan Lal/Sahir Ludhianvi) - Barsaat Ki Raat 1960"      [Hun Hun Hun ...]
 "Zindagi Bhar Yahi Ikrar Kiye Jayenge, Zindagi Bhar Yahi Ikrar Kiye Jayenge, Hum Tumhare Hain, Tumhein Pyar Kiye Jayenge, Zindagi Bhar Yahi Ikrar Kiye Jayenge, Koi Jalwa Na Samayega Nazar Mein Apni, Koi Jalwa Na Samayega Nazar Mein Apni, Sirf Sarkaar Ka Deedar Kiye Jayenge    (Duet Asha Bhosle - Ravi/Shakeel Badayuni) - Kaun Apna Kaun Paraya 1963" 
 "Zindagi Dulhan Hai Aadhi Raat Ki (Solo - Madan Mohan Kohli) - Dulhan Ek Raat Ki 1966"
 "Zindagi Ek Safar Hain Suhana 3 (Duet Kishore Kumar - Shankar-Jaikishan/Hasrat Jaipuri) - Andaz 1971" (Last Film of 42-Year old Jaikishan who died on September 12, 1971)
 "Zindagi Guzarne Ko Saathi Ek Chaahiye Husn Gar Nahin Sharab Hi Sahin (Solo - Ravi/Sahir Ludhianvi) - Ek Mahal Ho Sapano Ka 1975"
 "Zindagi Hain Kya Sun Meri Jaan Pyaar Bhara Dil Meethi Jubaan (Business/Birthday-Ice-Cream Solo - Salil Chowdhary/Majrooh Sultanpuri) - Maya 1961"
 "Zindagi Jis Ne Tujhe Di Hain (Solo - Chitragupt/Rajendra Krishan) - Kangan 1959"
 "Zindagi Ka Carvaan Ab Le Ke Jaaye Kahan Har Taraf Chhaya Hua Hain Aasoon Ka Dhua  (Solo - Sharda Sinha) - Maila Aanchal 1979"      [Chal Diye Sab Chodkar Hum Ko Hawaon Ki Tarah, Ab Jalenge Zindagi Bhar Hum Chitaonki Tarah, ...]
 "Zindagi Ka Yun Zubaan Par Naam (Multi Amit Kumar and Asha Bhosle - Laxmikant-Pyarelal/Anand Bakshi) - Dil Ka Heera 1979"
 "Zindagi Ka, Hain Yeh Fasana, Kahin Mera Dil, Kahin Main, ..Mere Sapanon Ki, Kho Gayi Manzil, Mere Sapanon Ki, Kho Gayi Manzil, Kahin Manzil, Kahin Main, Kahin Mera Dil, Kahin Main (Solo - Subir Sen) - Mid-Night 1972" (Filmed in London England and unreleased)
 "Zindagi Ke Mod Par Jo Koi Raasta Mila Teri Gali Se Jaa Mila (Solo - Roshan Lal/Shakeel Badayuni) - Bedaagh 1965" 
 "Zindagi Ke Safar Mein Akele The Hum, Mil Gaye Tum To Dil Ko Sahara Mila, Aa Gaye Ek Naye Raste Par Kadam, Jab Tumhare Nazar Ka Ishara Mila (Solo - Ravi/Shakeel Badayuni) - Nartaki 1963"
 "Zindagi Ke Safar Mein Na Jaane Kab Kaise Yeh Do Anjaane (Solo - Hemant Bhosle/Yogesh Gaud) - Damaad 1978"
 "Zindagi Ki Raah Mein Tez Chal (Duet Ameerbai Karnataki - Ameerbai Karnataki/Ameer Usmani Deobandi) - Shahnaz 1948"
 "Zindagi Kya Hain, Gham Ka Dariya Hain (Message Solo - Ravi/Shakeel Badayuni) - Pyar Kiya To Darna Kya 1963"
 "Zindagi Le Kar Hatheli Par, Diwane Aa Gaye, Aji Teer Khane Ke Liye, Ban Kar Neeshane Aa Gaye (Qawali Manna Dey and Dilraj Kaur - O. P. Nayyar/Ahmed Wasi) - Heera Moti 1979"       [Aji Tum Mere Nazadik Ho, Ab Dhadhakon Ki Khair Ho, Zulf Mein Uljha Hain Dil, Ab Uljhanon Ki Khair Ho, Dushmanon Ke Saath Kitne Pyar Se Baithe Ho Tum, Yeh Dua Hain Aaj Mere Dushmanon Ki Khair Ho, Aji Dekh Te Hain Khoobsurat Pyar Ki Tasveer Ko, Aaj De Te Hain Dua Hum, Apni Hi Taqdeer Ko, Teer Khane Ka Maza Hain, Aap Ki Hi Haath Se, Hans Rokenge Jigar Par, Aap Ke Har Teer Ko, Hans Rokenge Jigar Par, Aap Ke Har Teer Ko, Zindagi Haaye Haaye, ...]
 "Zindagi Mein Aaya Toofan, Zindagi Mein Aaya Toofan, Hoo Way Aaj Sab Paraye, Din Yeh Kaise Aaye, Do Ghadi Mein Aaya Toofan (Solo - Laxmikant-Pyarelal/Farooq Qaiser) - Aaya Toofan I 1964"      [Aa Aa Aa ..O O O ...]
 "Zindagi Mein Rang Bhara Hain Pyar Ka Aa Gaya Hain Ab Bahar Ka Hoy Hoy Zindagi Mein Hoy  Hoy Zindagi Mein (Cycle Duet Asha Bhosle - Bipin Babul) - Bus Conductor 1959"      [Ha Ha O Ho, O Ho Ha Ha Ha, Ha Ha O Ho, O Ho Ha Ha Ha ...]
 "Zindagi Mujh Ko Dikha De Rasta Tujh Ko Meri Hasraton Ka Wastaa (Outdoor Solo - Shankar-Jaikishan/Hasrat Jaipuri) - Sanjh Aur Savera 1964"      [O O O O O O ...]
 "Zindagi Naam Hain Waqt Ki Maar Ka 1 (Solo - Kalyanji Aanandji/Vishweshwar Sharma) - Hatyara 1977 and Evergreen Mohd Rafi ****"      [Jane Kaun Hawa Ka Jhonka Jivan Yahaan Badal Jaye Jane Kaun Hatyara Walmiki Ban Jaye ...]
 "Zindagi Naam Hain Waqt Ki Maar Ka 2 (Solo - Kalyanji-Anandji/Vishweshwar Sharma) - Hatyara 1977"      [Aaj Itihas Phir Khud Ko Dohara Raha Baap Ki Rah Beta ...]
 "Zindagi Naam Hain Waqt Ki Maar Ka 3 (Solo - Kalyanji-Anandji/Vishweshwar Sharma) - Hatyara 1977"      [Jiski Khatir Yahan Zindagi Bhar Lada ...]
 "Zindagi Naam Hain Waqt ki Maar Ka 4 (Solo - Kalyanji-Anandji/Vishweshwar Sharma) - Hatyara 1977"      [Kal Yahin Maan Tha, Aaj Apmaan Hain, Admi Ki Yanhan, Kis Ko Pehchan Hain, ...]
 "Zindagi Sanwar Gaye Mastiyon Se Bhar Gaye (Duet Shamshad Begum - Chitragupt/Shyam Hindi) - Sindbad Jahazi or Sindbad The Sailor 1952" (Omitted from Movie)
 "Zindagi Se Bhi Mujh Ko Aziz Ho Tum, Walla Kya Karoon Aisi Cheez Hain Tum (Duet Suman Kalyanpur - Robin Banerjee) - Raaz Ki Baat 1962 or 1970"
 "Zindagi Tang Hain, Mere Shero Utho, Aye Salero Utho, Dharm Ki Jung Hain (Duet Asha Bhosle - - N. Dutta aka Datta Naik/Sahir Ludhianvi) - Chandrakanta 1956"  [Zindagi Tang Hain, Zindagi Tang Hain, ...]    
 "Zindagi Teri Yaadon Mein, Phir Bhi Khoyi Nahin, Tu Jo Nahin Koi Mera Mera Koi Nahin, Zindagi Teri Yaadon Mein, Phir Bhi Khoyi Nahin (Solo - Kalyanji-Anandji) - Darinda 1977"      [Tu Jo Nahin Koi Mera Mera Koi Nahin ...]
 "Zindagi To Bewafa Hain, Ek Din Thukarayegi, Maut Mehbooba Hain, Maut Mehbooba Hain, Apne SAath Le Kar Jayegi, Mar Ke Jeene Ki Aada Jo Duniya Ko Sikhlayega, Woh Muqaddar Ka Sikandar Jaane Man.. (Solo - Kalyanji-Anandji/Anjaan) - Muqaddar Ka Sikandar 1978"      [Aa Aa Aa ...]
 "Zindagi Tu Jhoom Le Zara Keh Rahi Hain Tujh Se Yeh Fiza Saaj-E-Dil Tu Koi Geet Ga Ga Ga Ga (Outdoor - S. D. Burman/Shakeel Badayuni) - Kaise Kahoon 1964"      [O O O O O O ...]
 "Zindagi Woh Kya Na Pyar Jis Mein Ho Saath Agar Ho Saathi Dil Ka Maja Safar Mein Hain (Swing Duet Lata Mangeshkar - Laxmikant-Pyarelal/Rajendra Krishan) - Jawab 1970"
 "Zindagi Zinda-dili Ka Naam Hain, Zindagi Zinda-dili Ka Naam Hain (Solo - Laxmikant-Pyarelal/Verma Malik) - Zindaa Dil 1975" 
 "Zindagi Zindagi (Multi Mukesh and Asha Bhosle - Madan Mohan Kohli/Rajendra Krishan) - Chowkidar 1974"      [Oye Oye Oye Oye O Balle O Balle O Balle O Balle Hadippa Hadippa Hadippa Hadippa ..Insannon Se Kyun Jhukte Ho ...]
 "Zubaan E Yaar Man Turki (Duet Asha Bhosle - O. P. Nayyar/Shamshul Huda Bihari) - Ek Musafir Ek Hasina 1962"
 "Zulf Bikhrati Chali Aayee Ho Ae Ji Socho To Zara-a-a Badli Ka Kya Hoga (Solo - Madan Mohan Kohli/Rajendra Krishan) - Ek Kali Muskayee 1968"
 "Zulf Hain Dosh Par Soorat To Aisi Ho Dekh Jise Chanda Sharmaye (Multi Talat Mahmood, C. Ramchandra and Francis Waz - C. Ramchandra) - Baarish 1957"
 "Zulf Ke Phande Phans Gayi Jaan Mar Gaya Main To O Meri Maan (Solo - O. P. Nayyar/Majrooh Sultanpuri) - Mujrim 1958"
 "Zulf Ki Chhaon Mein Chehre Ka Ujala Lekar (Sher-O-Shayari Duet Asha Bhosle - O. P. Nayyar/Majrooh Sultanpuri) - Phir Wohi Dil Laya Hoon 1963"      [Ab Ke To Dilwale To Bhanware Hai Bhataknewale ...]
 "Zulf Lehrai Teri (Solo - Ravi/Rajendra Krishan) - Yeh Raaste Hain Pyar Ke 1963"
 "Zulfon Ko Aap Yoon Na Sanwaara Karo Ishq Warna Kisi Din Bahek Jayega (Duet Asha Bhosle - R. D. Burman/Anand Bakshi) - Chandan Ka Palna 1967"
 "Zulfon Ko Hata Le Chehre Se Ho Ho Ha Ha Hone De..Zulfon Ko Hata Le Chehre Se Thodasa Ujala Hone De (Solo - O. P. Nayyar/Shamshul Huda Bihari) - Saawan Ki Ghata 1966"
 "Zulfon Mein Chhupana (Duet Hemlata - Sonik-Omi/C. L.Rawal) - Ladki Pasand Hai 1971"
 "Zulfon Waalon Se Na Bhool Ke Bhi Pyar Kijiye (Duet Shamshad Begum - Dilip Dholakiya/Prem Dhawan) - Bhagdaad Ki Raatein 1962"
 "Zulm Bhi Karte Hain Aur (Duet Suman Kalyanpur - Sardar Malik/Hasrat Jaipuri) - Mera Ghar Mere Bachche 1960" 
 "Zulm E Ulfat Pe Humein Log (Duet Asha Bhosle - Roshan Lal/Sahir Ludhianvi) - Taj Mahal 1963"
 "Zulm O Sitam Ko Bhi Hum To Ada Samajhe Par Meri Chahat Ko Jaane Woh Kya Samajhe (Solo - Shankar-Jaikishan/Shailendra) - Jawan Mohabbat 1971"
 "Zulm Sahe Na Zulm Kare Na (Duet Lata Mangeshkar - C. Ramchandra/Rajendra Krishan) - Insaniyat 1955"

See also 
 Mohammed Rafi
 List of songs recorded by Mohammed Rafi
 Recorded songs (A)
 Recorded songs (B-C)
 Recorded songs (D-F)
 Recorded songs (G)
 Recorded songs (H-I)
 Recorded songs (J)
 Recorded songs (K)
 Recorded songs (L)
 Recorded songs (M)
 Recorded songs (N)
 Recorded songs (O)
 Recorded songs (P-R)
 Recorded songs (S)
 Recorded songs (T)

External links 
 Mohammed Rafi Songs: All Music

U
Rafi, Mohammed